= Dual-axis optical coherence tomography =

Optical imaging modality

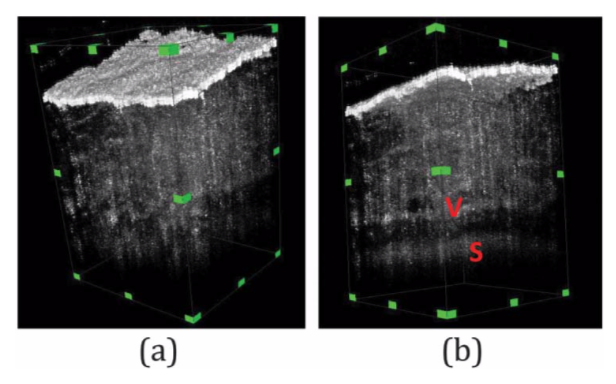
Image volume of porcine ear skin acquired by DA-OCT (see Visualization 1). (a) A bounding box of 1.2 mm × 1.2 mm × 2 mm is shown as a scale. (b) Blood vessels (V) and subcutaneous tissue (S) can be observed in the image volume.

Dual-axis optical coherence tomography (DA-OCT) is an imaging modality that is based on the principles of optical coherence tomography (OCT). These techniques are largely used for medical imaging. OCT is non-invasive and non-contact. It allows for real-time, in situ imaging and provides high image resolution. OCT is analogous to ultrasound but relies on light waves (typically near-infrared), which makes it faster than ultrasound. In general, OCT has proven to be compact and portable. It is compatible with arterial catheters and endoscopes, which helps diagnose diseases within long internal cavities, including the esophagus (Barrett's disease) and coronary arteries (cardiovascular disease).

The biggest limitation with traditional OCT is that it relies on detecting ballistic (non-scattered) photons, which can have a mean free path of only 100 microns, or singly backscattered photons. This strongly restricts depth penetration in highly-scattering biological tissue. It causes unsatisfactory signal-to-noise ratio (SNR) at deep regions. To overcome this issue, DA-OCT uses angled source and detection components and a tunable lens to create an enhanced depth of focus and improve depth penetration in biological tissue.

== Design ==
=== Dual-axis architecture ===
DA-OCT applies a dual-axis architecture to a spectral-domain OCT system. The objective is to improve the depth of view within biological tissue. Dual-axis architecture with coherence imaging was introduced in the early 2010s. Prior to the development of DA-OCT, the dual-axis design was commonly used with multiple-scattering multispectral low coherence interferometry (ms2/LCI), a technique that also analyzes multiply scattered light to take depth-resolved images from optical scattering media.

For this architecture, the light source and detector are tilted at equal and opposite angles to create a dual-axis. The slight scattering angle increases the chance of collecting more photons being scattered within the tissue. The greater the angle of the source and the detector, the deeper the focal zone. But there is also a problem: the greater the angle, the smaller the focal zone. Even though the chance of detecting a diffused photon increases, the size of the region has decreased.

=== Tunable lens ===
To fix the decreasing focal zone size problem, a tunable lens is used. The tunable lens allows dynamic focusing, where the focal zone can be scanned at various tissue depths. The data from different scans are stitched into a single image using an algorithm similar to one used in Gabor-domain optical coherence microscopy. This forms an enhanced depth of focus, allowing for greater penetration depth within turbid media.

=== Instrument setup ===
Light from a broadband supercontinuum laser is filtered to a range of 1240 to 1390 nm and directed into a fiber coupler. The fiber coupler implements an interferometer, the hallmark of OCT, which splits the input light into sample and reference arms. The dual-axis architecture was added to the sample arm, angling the both light coming from the laser source and the light directed at the detector. By changing the angle, it increases the chance of gathering more light scattered at random angles deep in the media. DA-OCT also uses a micro-electromechanical system (MEMS) mirror for faster beam scanning. This helps decrease the integration time since DA-OCT has to gather scans at multiple depths to form a single image.

== Experimental applications ==
For both DA-OCT and OCT, the research group imaged the samples with the tunable lens and without the tunable lens. In their results, they referred to DA-OCT with the tunable lens as DA-DOF+ and DA-OCT without the tunable lens as just DA-OCT. (DOF+ indicates "enhanced depth of focus".) The group referred to on-axis OCT with the tunable lens as On-Axis OCT DOF+. They referred to on-axis OCT without the tunable lens as OCT or On-Axis OCT.

For quantitative experiments, contrast-to-noise ratio (CNR) was used as the main metric to determine image quality. They typically imaged a needle inside the scattering media, so CNR was expressed by:

$CNR = {\left\vert \mu_s - \mu_m \right\vert \over \sqrt{\sigma_s^2 + \sigma_m^2}}$

where μ_{s} is the mean pixel count of the needle profile, μ_{m} is the mean pixel count of the surrounding media, σ_{s} and σ_{m} are the corresponding standard deviations.

=== Imaging of scattering media ===
Wax's research group developed Intralipid-based hydrogel phantoms, which were imaged with DA-OCT, On-Axis OCT, and DA-DOF+. To mimic highly forward scattering biological tissue, one hydrogel phantom had a reduced scattering coefficient of 1.6 mm^{−1} and an anisotropy of 0.9. The other hydrogel phantom had a near-zero anisotropy value to act as the control. A needle was placed in both hydrogel phantoms to be imaged. In the high anisotropy case, there was no improvement in the CNR of DA-OCT compared to On-Axis OCT. Comparing DA-DOF+ to On-Axis OCT, there was a 17% increase in CNR. In the low anisotropy case, there was no significant increase in CNR of DA-OCT over On-Axis OCT, but there was a 31% increase for DA-DOF+ over On-Axis OCT.

=== In-vivo imaging ===
Wax's research group also observed a needle's CNR profile at different depths (~0 mm, 1.3 mm, 2.5 mm) within mouse skin. They imaged with On-Axis OCT, DA-OCT, On-Axis OCT DOF+, and DA-DOF+. For larger depths (>1 mm), DA-OCT and DA-DOF+ produced a better CNR than On-Axis OCT and On-Axis OCT DOF+. For example, the group found a 195% increase with DA-OCT versus On-Axis OCT, and a 169% increase with DA-DOF+ versus On-Axis OCT DOF+. The DA-OCT and DA-DOF+ did not show strong CNR at shallower depths compared to On-Axis OCT and On-Axis OCT DOF+ because the needle surface was located too far from the system's focal zone. In all cases, the modes with enhanced depth of focus (DOF+) had a significantly better CNR than the corresponding modes without the tunable lens. Overall, the trends match the group's conclusions: DA-OCT DOF+ provides the best CNR at greater depths.

=== Ex-vivo imaging ===
The research group led by Wax conducted a couple of qualitative studies. Firstly, they examined ex-vivo porcine ear skin using DA-OCT and traditional OCT. The epidermis appears brighter in the DA-OCT image, whereas it blends into the dermis layer in the traditional OCT image. DA-OCT detected a stronger signal from the photons than traditional OCT detected. Also, the epidermis layer appears thicker in the DA-OCT image meaning that more multiply-scattered photons were detected with DA-OCT compared to traditional OCT.

The group compared DA-OCT images of injured rat skin to histopathology slides of the same samples. According to the histopathology slides, the base of the rat skin is healthy (the control), while the middle and tip indicate injury and structural damage. The DA-OCT images match these conclusions. For the healthy base, the DA-OCT image shows homogeneous backscattering intensity. For the middle and tip, the DA-OCT images show regions of inhomogeneous backscattering, which are indicative of tissue necrosis.

== See also ==
- Angle-resolved low-coherence interferometry
- Ballistic photon
- Interferometry
- Medical imaging
- Optical coherence tomography
- Multiple-scattering low-coherence interferometry
- Tomography
