= Luminescence (disambiguation) =

Luminescence is emission of light by a substance not resulting from heat.

Luminescence may also refer to:

- Luminescence (EP), a 2009 EP by Neon Highwire
- Luminescence (album), a 2005 album by Anggun
- IV: Luminescence, a 2017 album by Boulevard
- Luminescence (journal), a scientific journal
- Luminescence!, a 1967 album by Barry Harris

== See also ==
- Luminescent (album), an album by The Sunshine Underground
- Luminance (disambiguation)
