= Novacam Technologies =

Technology company

Novacam Technologies Inc.
- Company type: Private
- Industry: OCT, NDT metrology, photonics
- Founded: 1997
- Headquarters: Dollard-des-Ormeaux, Quebec, Canada
- Products: OCT detectors, profilometers, scientific instruments, fiber-based probes
- Website: novacam.com

Novacam Technologies Inc. specializes in designing and manufacturing advanced metrology and imaging systems for industrial and bio-medical applications. Novacam's fiber-based optical profilometers and Optical Coherence Tomography (OCT) systems are based on low coherence interferometry. The fiber-based nature of Novacam's detector probes is unique in the optical metrology industry.

Novacam is a privately owned Canadian company that makes precision optical measuring instruments. It is headquartered in Dollard-des-Ormeaux (Greater Montreal), Quebec, Canada.

== History ==
Novacam Technologies was founded in 1997.

In 2004, Novacam began developing its first Optical Coherence Tomography product line based on advanced patented low coherence interferometry technology. Much of the underlying research was carried out in cooperation with the Industrial Materials Institute (IMI) and the Institute for Biodiagnostics (IBD), both research laboratories of the National Research Council of Canada. The resulting commercialized OCT detectors — MicroCam-3D (Note: See MicroCam-3D) for industrial applications and dOCTor-8 (Note: See dOCTor-8) for bio-medical applications — are employed internationally.

The initial product line was based on time-domain (TD-OCT) technology. The firm has also developed detectors based on Fourier domain - laser swept source (SS-OCT) technology. The detectors are equipped with fiber-based non-contact probes for flexible and adaptable deployment.

== Applications ==
The firm's profilometers are used for nondestructive testing metrology involving high-speed and high-precision surface inspection, surface imaging, and characterization, thick film and thin film thickness measurement, long profiles, cross-section imaging, and process control. Being fiber-based, they are able to operate in hostile environments and restricted spaces.

The firm's profilometers find applications in the semiconductor and electronics industry, micromachining, aerospace industry, casting, optical industry, plastics and glass industry, and fuel cell metrology. In the biomedical field, their Optical Coherence Tomography (OCT) detectors are used for micrometre-precision tissue imaging. in ophthalmology, otology and other precision fields.
