= Partha Sarathi Mukherjee =

Indian chemist and professor (born 1973)

- Born: 11 February 1973 (age 53); West Bengal, India
- Education: Triveni Devi Bhalotia College; Burdwan University; Jadavpur University; Indian Association for the Cultivation of Science; University of Göttingen; University of Utah
- Known for: Studies on organic nano structures, molecular sensors and nanocages
- Awards: 2008 INSA Young Scientists Medal; 2008 Microsoft Research Young Faculty Award; 2009 IUPAC Young Scientist award; 2012 NASI-SCOPUS Young Scientist Award; 2016 CRSI Bronze Medal; 2016 Shanti Swarup Bhatnagar Prize; Elected fellow of the Indian Academy of Science (FASc); Elected fellow of the World Academy of Science (FTWAS); Elected fellow of the Indian National Science Academy (FNA); Rigaku International Prize-2025
- Scientific career
- Fields: Inorganic chemistry; Supramolecular chemistry
- Workplaces: Indian Institute of Science; Ulsan University; University of Heidelberg; University of Kyoto
- Doctoral advisor: N. Ray Chaudhuri; Herbert W. Roesky; Peter J. Stang

Partha Sarathi Mukherjee (born 1973) is an Indian inorganic chemist and a professor at the Inorganic and Physical Chemistry department of the Indian Institute of Science. He is known for his studies on organic nano structures, molecular sensors and catalysis in nanocages. He is a recipient of the Swarnajayanthi Fellowship of the Department of Science and Technology and the Bronze Medal of the Chemical Research Society of India. The Council of Scientific and Industrial Research, the apex agency of the Government of India for scientific research, awarded him the Shanti Swarup Bhatnagar Prize for Science and Technology, one of the highest Indian science awards, in 2016, for his contributions to chemical sciences.

== Biography ==
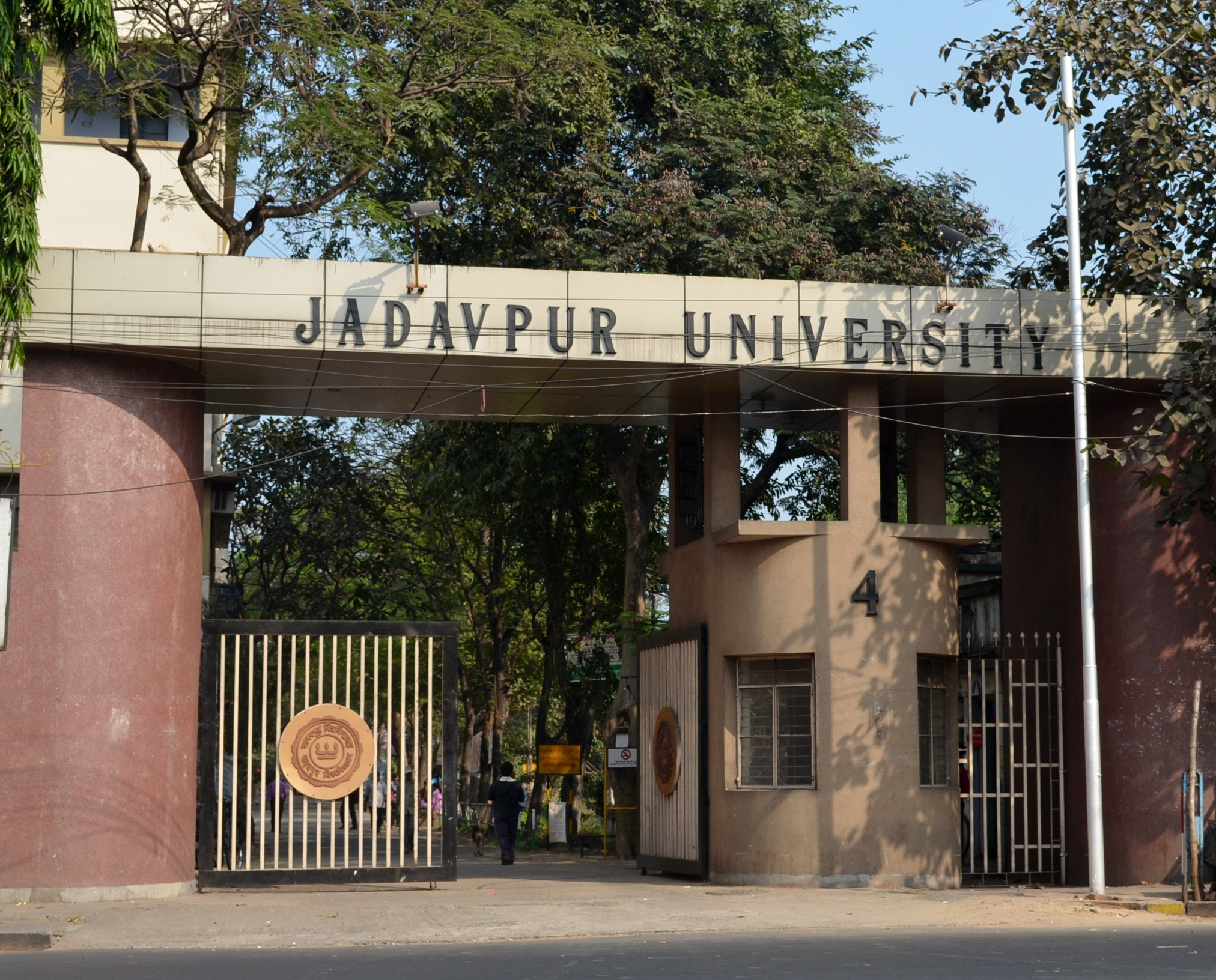
Jadavpur University

Born on 11 February 1973 in the village of Mankar in the Indian state of West Bengal. P. S. Mukherjee graduated in science (BSc hons) from the Triveni Devi Bhalotia College, affiliated to the University of Burdwan, in 1995. He completed his master's degree in inorganic chemistry from Jadavpur University in 1998. His doctoral studies were done at the Indian Association for the Cultivation of Science under the guidance of Nirmalendu Ray Chaudhuri and he was awarded a PhD for his thesis Synthesis, crystal structure and low temperature magnetic behaviour of Cu(II) polynuclear complexes of amines and their derivatives using different bridging ligands in 2002. Subsequently, he moved to the US for his post-doctoral studies at the laboratory of Peter J. Stang of the University of Utah where he stayed till 2004. Then he obtained an Alexander von Humboldt fellowship which enabled him to continue his work with Herbert W. Roesky at the University of Göttingen. On his return to India, he joined the Indian Institute of Science as an assistant professor. After serving as an associate professor during 2010–16, he is a professor at the department of inorganic and physical chemistry and the head of P. S. Mukherjee's Research Group. During this period, he had three stints abroad; as a visiting professor at Ulsan University (2010), as an Alexander von Humboldt visiting scientist at the University of Heidelberg and as a Japan Society for the Promotion of Science visiting scientist at the University of Kyoto.

== Legacy ==
Mukherjee's studies focus on supramolecular and organometallic materials, organic nano structures, molecular sensors and nanocages. He demonstrated the self-sorting of three-dimensional nanoscopic organic cages driven by the dynamic imine bond reportedly for the first time and proposed ways of regulating the supramolecualar interaction through H-bonding. The team led by him has also worked on Enzyme mimics, single molecule magnets of polynuclear clusters and catalysis in nanocages. His research has been documented by way of several peer-reviewed articles. At his group, he hosts a number of researchers and has already mentored many doctoral scholars. He is also associated with many science journals and serves as the associate editor of Inorganic Chemistry, and as a member of the advisory panel of the Scientific Reports journal of the Royal Society of Chemistry.

== Awards and honors ==
Mukherjee was selected by the Indian Academy of Sciences as a Young Associate in 2007. He received the Outstanding Young Faculty Award of Microsoft Research India and the Young Scientists Medal of the Indian National Science Academy in 2008. The Young Scientist Award of the International Union of Pure and Applied Chemistry (IUPAC) was awarded to him in 2009, followed by the Scopus Young Scientist Award, jointly sponsored by Elsevier and the National Academy of Sciences, India in 2012. In between, The World Academy of Sciences chose him as a Young Affiliate in 2011. He is an elected fellow of The World Academy of Sciences (Trieste, Italy). The Council of Scientific and Industrial Research awarded him the Shanti Swarup Bhatnagar Prize, one of the highest Indian science awards, in 2016 and he received the Bronze Medal of the Chemical Research Society of India the same year. Also in 2017, Mukherjee became a laureate of the Asian Scientist 100 by the Asian Scientist. A fellow of the Royal Society of Chemistry (2014) and an Alexander von Humboldt fellow during his post-doctoral days, he held various other research fellowships including the Marie-Curie International Fellowship (2004) and the Swarnajayanti Fellowship of the Department of Science and Technology (2012).

== See also ==
- Herbert W. Roesky
- Peter J. Stang
