= Gold nanocage =

Gold nanocages (AuNCs) are gold nanoparticles of size 20–500 nm with a hollow cubic structure and porous walls. They can be synthesized by reacting silver nanoparticles with chloroauric acid (HAuCl_{4}) in boiling water. Gold nanocages have been suggested for use in drug delivery, photothermal therapy, and as contrast agents.

== Origin and development ==
Gold nanocages were first created in 2002 by a group at Washington University in St. Louis, led by Younan Xia. He developed the idea for the synthesis when he was teaching galvanic replacement in a general chemistry course at the same time as a method for silver nanocube creation via polyol reduction was being developed.

Since the invention of AuNCs, research has focused on the development of alternative synthesis strategies for more precise tuning of nanocage structure and properties. Another significant area of nanocage development has been the investigation of their potential applications in photoacoustic tomography, photothermal cancer therapy, and controlled drug delivery.

== Synthetic procedure ==
=== Galvanic reaction overview ===
The fundamental reaction in the preparation of gold nanocages is a galvanic replacement reaction between chloroauric acid (HAuCl_{4}) and “sacrificial templates” made of Ag nanostructures:

3Ag_{(s)} + HAuCl_{4(aq)} → Au_{(s)} + 3AgCl_{(s)} + HCl_{(aq)}

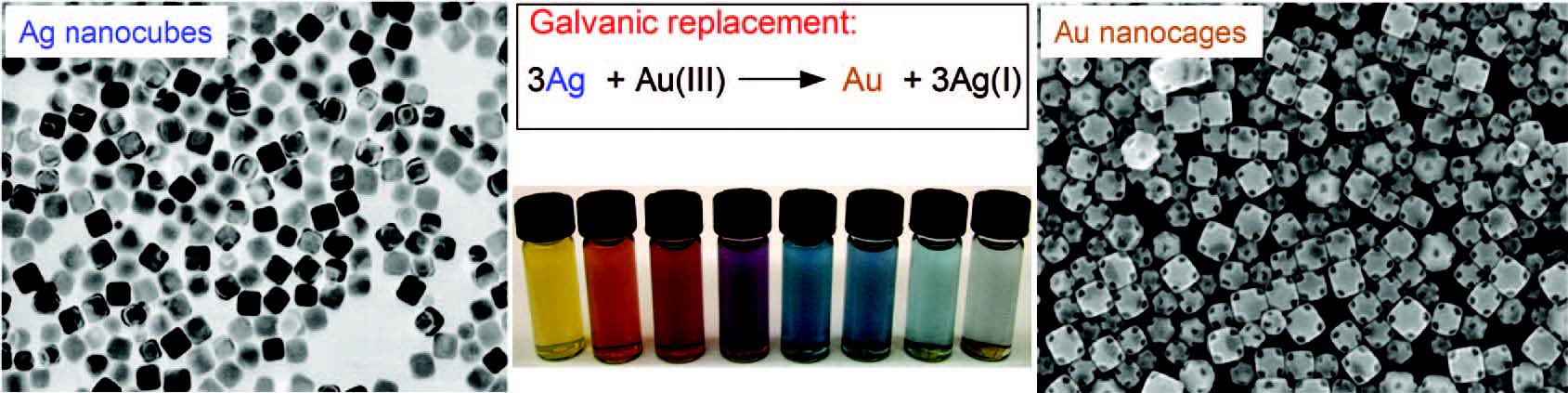
Schematic of synthesis of gold nanocubes via galvanic replacement reaction with Ag nanocube templates. In the reaction, Au^{3+} is reduced and gold is deposited on the silver template while Ag is oxidized and dissolved.

Silver nanotemplates (often nanocubes) can be synthesized via a polyol reduction in which ethylene glycol is oxidized by atmospheric oxygen to form glycolaldehyde. Glycolaldehyde can then be used to reduce Ag^{+} into elemental Ag.

2Ag^{+}_{(aq)} + HOCH_{2}CHO_{(aq)} + H_{2}O_{(l)} → 2Ag_{(s)} + HOCH_{2}COOH_{(aq)} + 2H^{+}_{(aq)}

AuNCs can be formed from different silver nanostructures, including nanocubes with sharp or truncated corners, single-crystal octahedrons with truncated corners, and polycrystalline quasi-spheres.

SEM and TEM (insert) images of preparation of AuNCs from Ag nanocubes with pointed corners. Ag dissolution begins at a pinhole on one of the cube faces and Au is deposited on the cube surfaces as the reaction progresses.

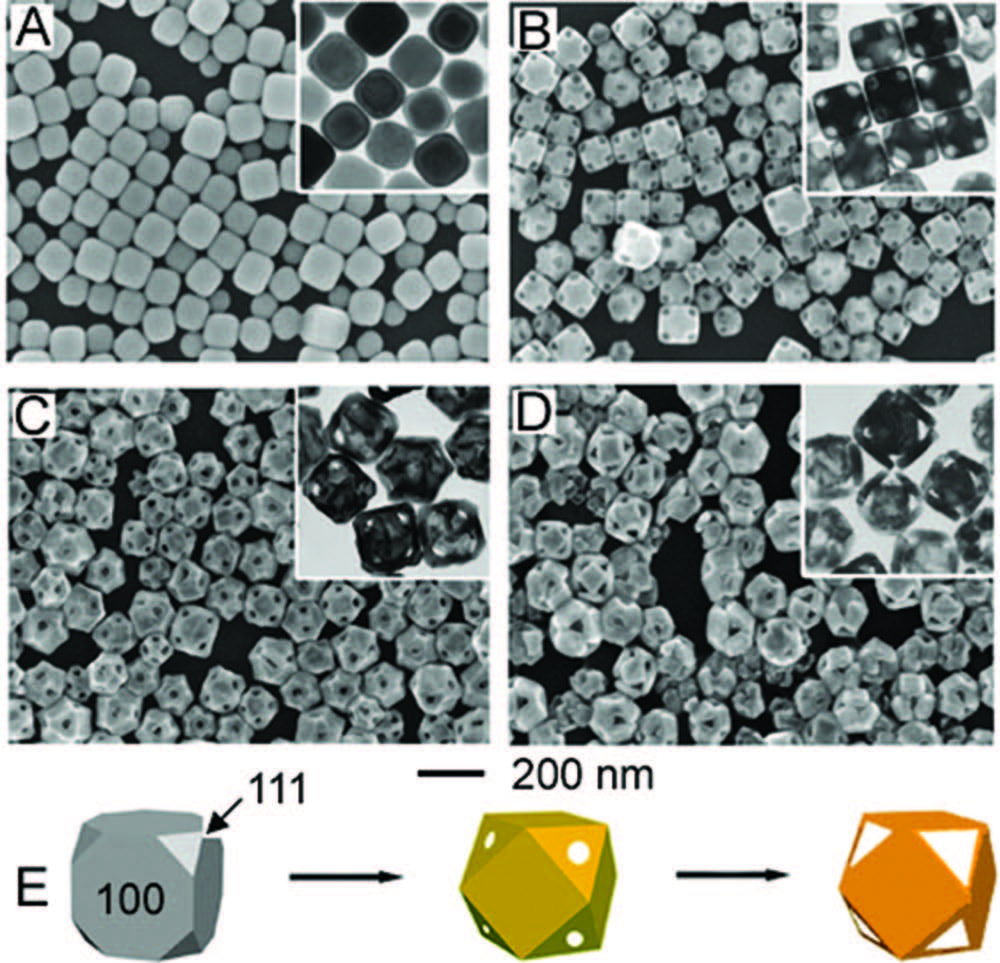
SEM and TEM (insert) images of preparation of AuNCs from Ag nanocubes with truncated corners. Ag dissolution begins at the corners of the nanocubes, and following gold deposition a gold nanocage is produced with porosity at all four corners.

=== Preparation via seed-mediated growth and etching ===
Seed-mediated growth followed by selective etching has been proposed as a more precise alternative to the traditional template-based galvanic reaction: in the traditional synthesis, the simultaneous reduction of AuCl_{4} and oxidation of Ag in the galvanic reaction can lead to difficulties in controlling nanocage structure (like the thickness of cage walls). In this alternative synthesis, a strong reductant like NaOH is added to the reaction mixture, reducing Au^{3+} ions faster than the galvanic replacement reaction. Patches of Ag_{2}O are formed at the corners of the Ag nanocubes; these patches can then be selectively etched using a weak acid that also dissolves the center of the cube, producing a gold nanocage. While offering control of cage wall thickness down to one atomic layer, seed-mediated growth and etching necessitates further reaction steps and more precise reaction conditions when compared to the traditional synthetic method.

=== Imaging AuNC synthesis ===
The synthesis and development of gold nanocages at various stages can be visualized using common electron microscopy techniques like scanning electron microscopy (SEM) and transmission electron microscopy (TEM). X-ray ptychography and scanning wide-angle nanoprobe diffraction (WAXS) have also been used to image the galvanic reaction process, allowing for differentiation between different compounds in the developing nanocages and visualization of their crystalline structure.

== Properties ==
=== General properties ===
The synthesis of AuNCs produces structures that can range in size from 20–500 nm, with wall thicknesses that can be tuned in the range of 2–10 nm (with accuracy up to 0.5 nm). Being bio-inert and nonreactive, AuNCs have been studied for in vivo biomedical applications. Their hollow centers increase surface area and functionality, allowing them to hold payloads for drug delivery.

=== Localized surface plasmon resonance (LSPR) ===
Absorbance spectra of gold nanocages with varying wall thicknesses and porosities, leading to observed color differences in colloidal solution

Much of the optical properties of gold nanocages derive from the phenomenon of LSPR (localized surface plasmon resonance). This LSPR effect leads to the observation that suspensions of gold nanocages can appear to be various colors.

LSPR is not unique to gold nanocages, and instead is a property of various classes of metal nanostructures. However, conventional (spherical, solid) gold nanoparticles exhibit LSPR peaks that are restricted to the visible light region of the electromagnetic spectrum. The hollow nature of AuNCs lead to increased surface area, resulting in a significantly higher absorption cross-section than traditional nanoparticles. This allows for LSPR that can be tunable to 600–1200 nm, in the near-infrared (NIR) region.^{1,7} This “tunability” can be achieved by modifying the size of AuNCs and the thickness of their walls, effectively altering the ratio of wall thickness to the overall size of the nanocage.

== Potential applications ==
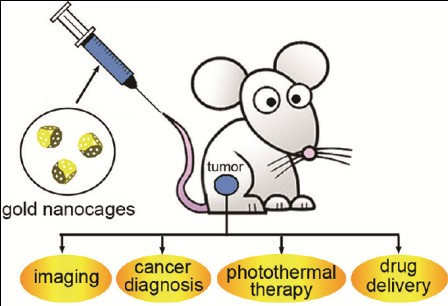
Schematic illustrating various biomedical applications of AuNCs

=== Delivery ===
To harness the properties of AuNCs for theranostic applications, it is essential to deliver gold nanocages precisely to targeted areas within the body. The addition of uncoated, bare nanocages to the biological system triggers the body's immune response, leading to protein deposition on the nanocages and the removal of AuNCs via the bloodstream. To circumvent this response, nontoxic coatings like polyethylene glycol (PEG) can be applied to the nanocage surface to "disguise" the nanoparticles, allowing them enough circulation time to collect in tumors. AuNCs can then be directed to malignant cells via passive or active targeting.

=== As biosensors and contrast enhancement agents ===
AuNCs have shown promise as biosensors: they can be engineered with artificial antibodies to detect biomarkers, or serve as electrochemical transducers for plasmonic sensing. These biosensing capabilities have afforded promising detection of kidney disease and lung cancer in laboratory studies. As the transparent window for soft tissue and blood lies between 650–900 nm, the ability of gold nanocages to exhibit LSPR in the NIR region led to their exploration as biomedical contrast agents. AuNCs are also promising contrast agents for optical coherence tomography (OCT) and spectroscopic optical coherence tomography (SOCT). Additionally, gold nanocages functionalized with iron oxide (Fe_{3}O_{4}) nanoparticles have been proposed as contrast agents for multimodal MRI/CT imaging.

=== Photothermal therapy ===
AuNCs are also promising candidates for photothermal therapy, in which heat is used to selectively kill cancer cells via hyperthermia. The large absorption cross-section of AuNCs makes this conversion efficient, taking place on timescales of 10–100 picoseconds (ps). When nanocages are able to be delivered to and taken up by tumor cells, subsequent exposure to NIR radiation can lead to heat-induced cell death.

=== Drug delivery ===
The photothermal properties of AuNCs can be combined with their hollow interiors to provide a method of drug delivery and controlled release. For drug delivery, nanocages can be filled with a specific drug payload and then sealed with a temperature-sensitive polymer. When the nanocages are exposed to NIR radiation, the nanocages’ photothermal effect raises the polymer above its melting point. As the polymer changes phases, the pores of the nanocage are exposed and the drug is released. When the radiation source is removed, the polymer re-seals the cages, allowing for control over drug release. This “smart” drug delivery system has been demonstrated in various in vitro and in vivo studies, in which researchers have demonstrated the ability of AuNCs to deliver chemotherapy drugs to targeted cells.

== See also ==
- Colloidal gold
- Gold nanorods
- Gold nanoparticles in chemotherapy
