= Alci =

Alci may refer to:

- Alci Monastery, Ladakh (or Alchi), a Tibetan Buddhist complex
  - Alci the nearby village
- "ALCI" or "a/LCI", Angle-resolved low-coherence interferometry, a technique in biomedical imaging
