= Luminance (disambiguation) =

Luminance is a photometric measure of the density of luminous intensity in a given direction, measured in candela per square metre (cd/m^{2}).

Luminance may also refer to:

- Relative luminance, luminance normalized with respect to a reference white
- Luma (video), an approximation of relative luminance, used in video signals

== See also ==
- Illuminance
- Luminescence (disambiguation)
