= Optical projection tomography =

Optical projection tomography of a developing mouse embryo, with Smoc1 expression highlighted.

Optical projection tomography is a form of tomography involving optical microscopy. The OPT technique is sometimes referred to as optical computed tomography (optical-CT) and optical emission computed tomography (optical-ECT) in the literature, to address the fact that the technique bears similarity to X-ray computed tomography (CT) and single-photon emission computed tomography (SPECT).

It is in many ways the optical equivalent of X-ray computed tomography or the medical CT scan. OPT differs in the way that it often uses ultraviolet, visible, and near-infrared photons as opposed to X-ray photons. However, essential mathematics and reconstruction algorithms used for CT and OPT are similar; for example, radon transform or iterative reconstruction based on projection data are used in both medical CT scan and OPT for 3D reconstruction.

Both medical CT and OPT compute 3D volumes based on transmission of the photon through the material of interest. Given that the tissue is typically opaque in the ultraviolet, visible, and near-infrared spectrum, the tissue must first be made clear with an optical clearing agent, so that the light can pass through. Common optical clearing agents include BABB and methyl salicylate (wintergreen).

OPT can assume two primary forms – transmission mode and emission mode. In transmission mode, where light is passed through an optically cleared sample, one can obtain structural information about the sample of interest. In emission mode, where the sample is exposed to excitation light, one can obtain functional information about the sample of interest. In tandem with organs harvested from genetically modified mouse that express fluorescent proteins such as green fluorescent proteins, the emission mode of OPT can yield 3D genetic expression images of the mouse organ.

The technique has already contributed to a large number of studies aimed at addressing a broad range of biological questions in diverse systems such as human, mice, chicken, fly, zebrafish, and plants. More recent adaptations have further enabled the use of the technique for studies of specimens on the adult mouse organ scale, individual cell nuclei, and longitudinal assessments of organ cultures.

Fluorescence optical projection tomography visualises the distribution of dyes in the specimen.

== See also ==
- Diffuse optical imaging
- Optical coherence tomography
- Optical tomography
