= Multiple scattering low coherence interferometry =

Multiple scattering low coherence interferometry (ms/LCI) is an imaging technique that relies on analyzing multiply scattered light in order to capture depth-resolved images from optical scattering media. With current applications primarily in medical imaging, has the advantage of a higher range since forward scattered light attenuates less with depth when compared to the specularly reflected light that is assessed in more conventional imaging methods such as optical coherence tomography. This allows ms/LCI to image through up to 90 mean free scattering paths, compared to roughly 27 scattering MFPs in OCT and 1–2 scattering MFPs in confocal microscopy.

== Design ==
=== Time-domain implementation ===
Early implementations of ms/LCI were in the time domain using lock-in detection in order to take advantage of long scanning depths as well narrow detection bandwidths. As in traditional OCT, the beam interference coherence gates the light in order to filter out photons that have not traveled a sufficient path length. The use of distinct, non-intersecting illumination and collection beams allows for time insensitive triangulation of the light that also considers physical depth penetration into the media in order to reject diffuse backscattering light such that only forward scattered photons are analyzed. Unlike traditional OCT, the measured forward scattered light is diverged by a lens in order to isolate the angular component to be compared with the reference arm. Due to the dominance of forward scattering photons at deeper penetration depths, this technique enjoys superior imaging depth and high detection throughput but suffers from long signal acquisition time and poor spatial resolution inherent to time-domain techniques.

=== Spectral-domain implementation ===
By adapting techniques used in spectroscopic OCT, ms/LCI can be done in the spectral domain in order to provide faster acquisition time and various multispectral capabilities, including the use of localized contrast agents. As in OCT, enhanced depth imaging is used to place the zero-path delay point behind the focal volume in order to increase sensitivity. A broadband supercontinuum laser source as well as a customized spectrometer detector are implemented in order to access the spectral domain, and a short-time Fourier transform method is used to process the interferograms as in spectroscopic OCT.

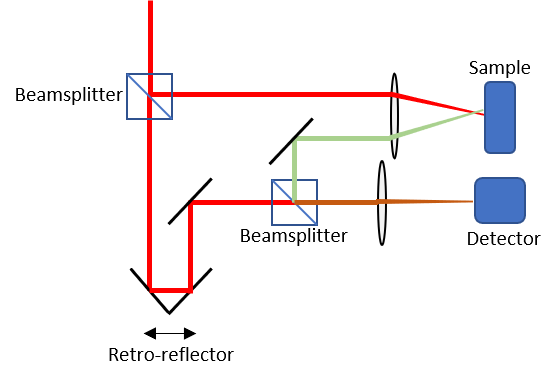
Diagram of a hypothetical ms/LCI setup.

== Applications ==
Because of enhanced depth penetration, this technique's most promising applications lie in resolving features that exist deeper in tissue than other techniques such as OCT are capable of doing. Studies have determined ms/LCI's feasibility in a variety of clinical applications, including assessing burn injuries, as well as in vivo imaging of rat skin with superior depth results when compared to OCT.

== Considerations ==
=== Spatial resolution ===
Photons originating from the focal plane detected by ms/LCI will undergo multiple scattering events which causes extra travel time and resulting longer path lengths than the signal would otherwise indicate. This axial shift will make photons appear like they appear deeper from the sample than they actually are.

The presence of multiple scattering events causes a distribution of path lengths that intrinsically blurs the image, resulting in a maximum millimeter-scale resolution which is substantially poorer than OCT which operates at a micrometer-scale resolution.

Because of anisotropic propagation of light in tissue, the lateral profile will spread out slowly relative to axial profile, resulting in an elongated image.

Spectral-domain ms/LCI uniquely needs to account for the wavelength dependence of scattering when interpreting the reflectance depth profile as well as the transfer of information between layers; light emerging from deeper portions of tissue experience loss from absorption and scattering at all layers above it.

=== Signal-to-noise ratio ===
Predictably, ms/LCI requires high signal sensitivity in order to detect high-depth multiply scattered photons. Lock-in amplifiers help to increase signal-to-noise ratio (SNR) of the signals in both cases, and the use of apertures and precise illumination angles can minimize the amount of scattered light detected from superficial depths.

In time-domain ms/LCI, long integration times and depth scans provide improved contrast and sensitivity while sacrificing acquisition time. The use of a balanced photoreceiver is helpful to increase signal-to-noise ratio in time-domain ms/LCI but is difficult to do in spectral-domain ms/LCI because the increased depth range results in higher modulation frequencies which are difficult to calibrate between spectrometers
