= Light =

Electromagnetic radiation humans can see

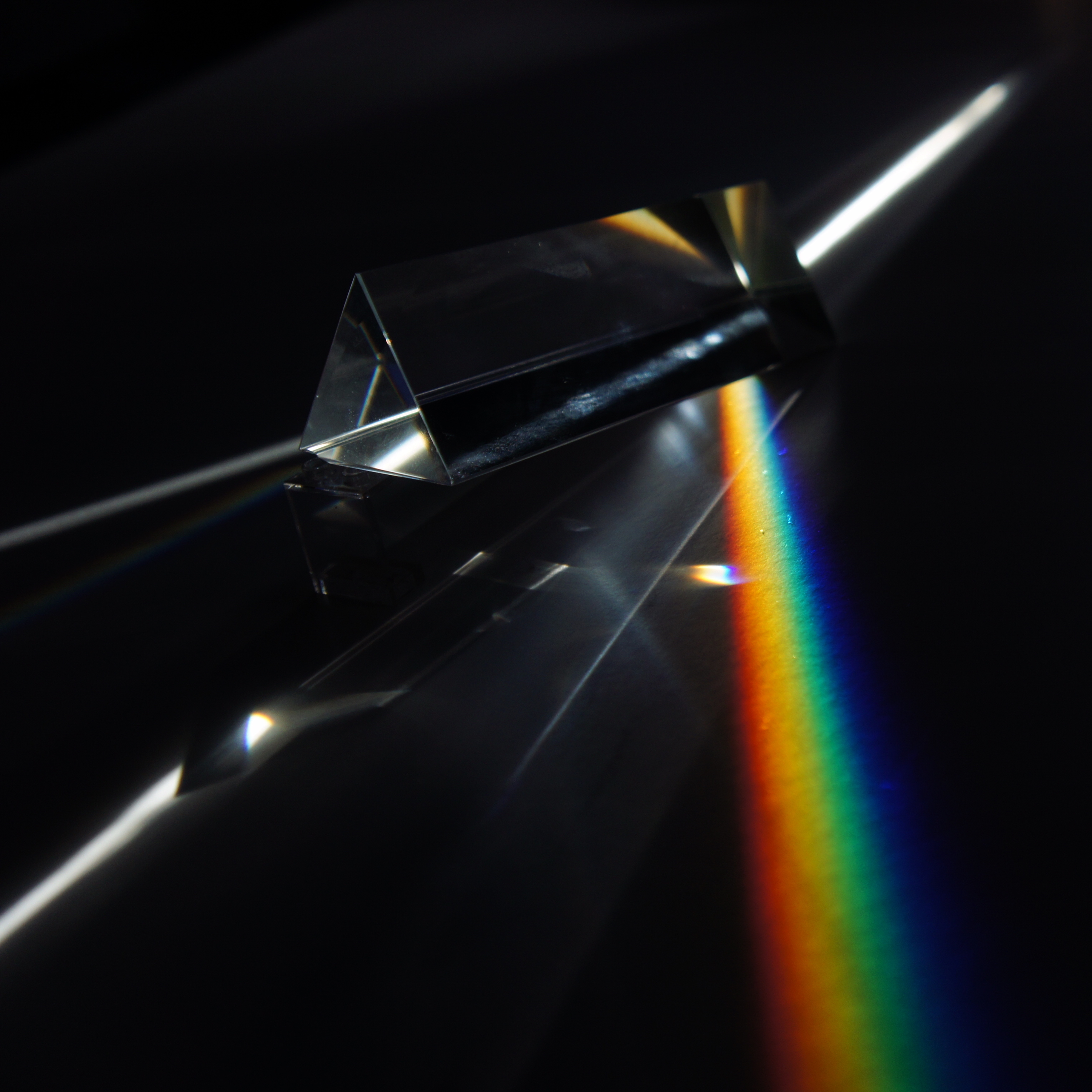
A triangular prism dispersing a beam of white light. The longer wavelengths (red) and the shorter wavelengths (green-blue) are separated.

Light, visible light, or visible radiation is electromagnetic radiation that can be perceived by the human eye. Visible light spans the visible spectrum and is usually defined as having wavelengths in the range of 400–700 nanometers (nm), corresponding to frequencies of 750–420 terahertz. The visible band sits adjacent to the infrared (with longer wavelengths and lower frequencies) and the ultraviolet (with shorter wavelengths and higher frequencies), called collectively optical radiation.

In physics, the term "light" may refer more broadly to electromagnetic radiation of any wavelength, whether visible or not. In this sense, gamma rays, X-rays, microwaves and radio waves are also light. This is why visible radiation is commonly termed visible light.

The primary properties of light are intensity, propagation direction, frequency or wavelength spectrum, and polarization. Its speed in vacuum, 299792458 m/s, is one of the fundamental constants of nature. All electromagnetic radiation exhibits some properties of both particles and waves. Single, massless elementary particles, or quanta, of light called photons can be detected with specialized equipment; phenomena like interference are described by waves. Most everyday interactions with light can be understood using geometrical optics. Quantum optics is an important research area in modern physics.

The main source of natural light on Earth is the Sun. Historically, another important source of light for humans has been fire, from ancient campfires to modern kerosene lamps. With the development of electric lights and power systems, electric lighting has effectively replaced firelight.

== Electromagnetic spectrum and visible light ==
The electromagnetic spectrum, with the visible portion highlighted. The bottom graph (Visible spectrum) is wavelength in units of nanometers (nm).

Generally, electromagnetic radiation (EMR) is classified by wavelength into radio waves, microwaves, infrared, the visible spectrum that we perceive as light, ultraviolet, X-rays and gamma rays. The designation "radiation" excludes static electric, magnetic and near fields.

The behavior of EMR depends on its wavelength. Higher frequencies have shorter wavelengths and lower frequencies have longer wavelengths. When EMR interacts with single atoms and molecules, its behavior depends on the amount of energy per quantum it carries.

EMR in the visible light region consists of quanta (called photons) that are at the lower end of the energies that are capable of causing electronic excitation within molecules, which leads to changes in the bonding or chemistry of the molecule. At the lower end of the visible light spectrum, EMR becomes invisible to humans (infrared) because its photons no longer have enough individual energy to cause a lasting molecular change (a change in conformation) in the visual molecule retinal in the human retina, which change triggers the sensation of vision.

There exist animals that are sensitive to various types of infrared, but not by means of quantum-absorption. Infrared sensing in snakes depends on a kind of natural thermal imaging, in which tiny packets of cellular water are raised in temperature by the infrared radiation. EMR in this range causes molecular vibration and heating effects, which is how these animals detect it.

Above the frequency range of visible light, ultraviolet light becomes invisible to humans, mostly because it is absorbed by the cornea with wavelengths shorter than 360 nm and the internal lens at wavelengths shorter than 400 nm. Furthermore, the rods and cones located in the retina of the human eye cannot detect the very short (shorter than 360 nm) ultraviolet wavelengths and are in fact damaged by ultraviolet. Many animals with eyes that do not require lenses (such as insects and shrimp) are able to detect ultraviolet, by quantum photon-absorption mechanisms, in much the same chemical way that humans detect visible light.

Various sources define visible light as narrowly as 420–680 nm to as broadly as 380–800 nm. Under ideal laboratory conditions, people can see infrared up to at least 1,050 nm; children and young adults may perceive ultraviolet wavelengths down to about 310–313 nm.

Plant growth is also affected by the color spectrum of light, a process known as photomorphogenesis.

== Speed of light ==
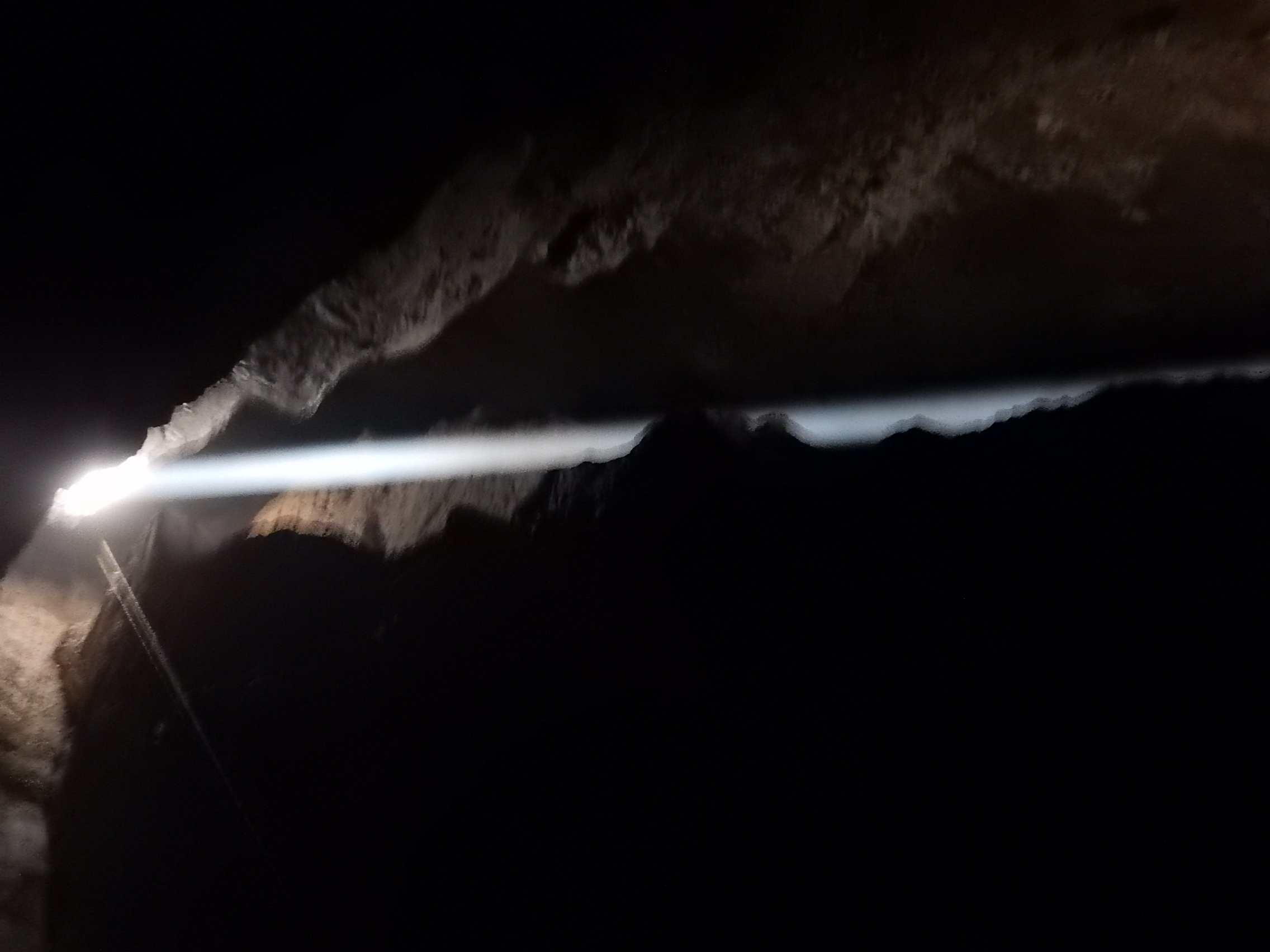
Beam of sun light inside the cavity of Rocca ill'Abissu at Fondachelli-Fantina, Sicily

The speed of light in vacuum is defined to be exactly 299792458 m/s (approximately 186,282 miles per second). The fixed value of the speed of light in SI units results from the fact that the meter is now defined in terms of the speed of light. All forms of electromagnetic radiation move at exactly this same speed in vacuum.

Different physicists have attempted to measure the speed of light throughout history. Galileo attempted to measure the speed of light in the seventeenth century. An early experiment to measure the speed of light was conducted by Ole Rømer, a Danish physicist, in 1676. Using a telescope, Rømer observed the motions of Jupiter and one of its moons, Io. Noting discrepancies in the apparent period of Io's orbit, he calculated that light takes about 22 minutes to traverse the diameter of Earth's orbit. However, its size was not known at that time. If Rømer had known the diameter of the Earth's orbit, he would have calculated a speed of 227000000 m/s.

Another more accurate measurement of the speed of light was performed in Europe by Hippolyte Fizeau in 1849. Fizeau directed a beam of light at a mirror several kilometers away. A rotating cog wheel was placed in the path of the light beam as it traveled from the source, to the mirror and then returned to its origin. Fizeau found that at a certain rate of rotation, the beam would pass through one gap in the wheel on the way out and the next gap on the way back. Knowing the distance to the mirror, the number of teeth on the wheel and the rate of rotation, Fizeau was able to calculate the speed of light as 313000000 m/s.

Léon Foucault carried out an experiment which used rotating mirrors to obtain a value of 298000000 m/s in 1862. Albert A. Michelson conducted experiments on the speed of light from 1877 until his death in 1931. He refined Foucault's methods in 1926 using improved rotating mirrors to measure the time it took light to make a round trip from Mount Wilson to Mount San Antonio in California. The precise measurements yielded a speed of 299796000 m/s.

The effective velocity of light in various transparent substances containing ordinary matter, is less than in vacuum. For example, the speed of light in water is about 3/4 of that in vacuum.

Two independent teams of physicists were said to bring light to a "complete standstill" by passing it through a Bose–Einstein condensate of the element rubidium, one team at Harvard University and the Rowland Institute for Science in Cambridge, Massachusetts and the other at the Harvard–Smithsonian Center for Astrophysics, also in Cambridge. However, the popular description of light being "stopped" in these experiments refers only to light being stored in the excited states of atoms, then re-emitted at an arbitrary later time, as stimulated by a second laser pulse. During the time it had "stopped", it had ceased to be light.

== Optics ==

The study of light and the interaction of light and matter is termed optics. Optics has different forms appropriate to different circumstances. Geometrical optics, appropriate for understanding things like eyes, lenses, cameras, fiber optics, and mirrors, works well when the wavelength of light is small in comparison to the objects it interacts with. Physical optics incorporates wave properties and is needed to understand diffraction and interference. Quantum optics applies when studying individual photons interacting with matter.

=== Surface scattering ===
A transparent object allows light to transmit or pass through. Conversely, an opaque object does not allow light to transmit through and instead reflects or absorbs the light it receives. Most objects do not reflect or transmit light specularly and to some degree scatter the incoming light, which is called glossiness. Surface scattering is caused by the surface roughness of the reflecting surfaces, and internal scattering is caused by the difference of refractive index between the particles and medium inside the object. Like transparent objects, translucent objects allow light to transmit through, but translucent objects also scatter certain wavelengths of light via internal scattering.

=== Refraction ===
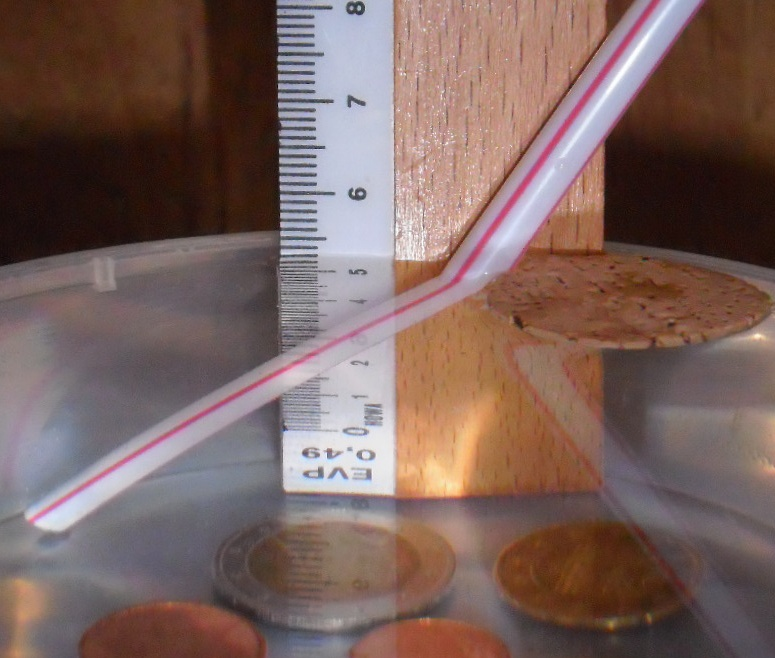
Due to refraction, the straw dipped in water appears bent and the ruler scale compressed when viewed from a shallow angle.

Refraction is the bending of light rays when they pass through a surface between one transparent material and another. It is described by Snell's Law:

$$n_1\sin\theta_1 = n_2\sin\theta_2$$

where θ_{1} is the angle between the ray and the surface normal in the first medium, θ_{2} is the angle between the ray and the surface normal in the second medium and n_{1} and n_{2} are the indices of refraction, n = 1 in a vacuum and n > 1 in a transparent substance.

When a beam of light crosses the boundary between a vacuum and another medium, or between two different media, the wavelength of the light changes, but the frequency remains constant. If the beam of light is not orthogonal (normal) to the boundary, the change in wavelength results in a change in the direction of the beam. This change of direction is known as refraction.

The refractive property of lenses is frequently used to manipulate light in order to change the apparent size of images. Magnifying glasses, spectacles, contact lenses, microscopes and refracting telescopes are all examples of this manipulation.

== Light sources ==
There are many sources of light. A body at a given temperature emits a characteristic spectrum of black-body radiation. A simple thermal source is sunlight, the radiation emitted by the chromosphere of the Sun at around 6,000 K (5,730 °C; 10,340 °F). Solar radiation peaks in the visible region of the electromagnetic spectrum when plotted in wavelength units, and roughly 44% of the radiation that reaches the ground is visible. Another example is incandescent light bulbs, which emit only around 10% of their energy as visible light and the remainder as infrared. A common thermal light source in history is the glowing solid particles in flames, but these also emit most of their radiation in the infrared and only a fraction in the visible spectrum.

The peak of the black-body spectrum is in the deep infrared, at about 10 micrometer wavelength, for relatively cool objects like human beings. As the temperature increases, the peak shifts to shorter wavelengths, producing first a red glow, then a white one and finally a blue-white color as the peak moves out of the visible part of the spectrum and into the ultraviolet. These colors can be seen when metal is heated to "red hot" or "white hot". Blue-white thermal emission is not often seen, except in stars (the commonly seen pure-blue color in a gas flame or a welder's torch is in fact due to molecular emission, notably by CH radicals emitting a wavelength band around 425 nm and is not seen in stars or pure thermal radiation).

Atoms emit and absorb light at characteristic energies. This produces "emission lines" in the spectrum of each atom. Emission can be spontaneous, as in light-emitting diodes, gas discharge lamps (such as neon lamps and neon signs, mercury-vapor lamps, etc.) and flames (light from the hot gas itself—so, for example, sodium in a gas flame emits characteristic yellow light). Emission can also be stimulated, as in a laser or a microwave maser.

Deceleration of a free charged particle, such as an electron, can produce visible radiation: cyclotron radiation, synchrotron radiation and bremsstrahlung radiation are all examples of this. Particles moving through a medium faster than the speed of light in that medium can produce visible Cherenkov radiation. Certain chemicals produce visible radiation by chemoluminescence. In living things, this process is called bioluminescence. For example, fireflies produce light by this means and boats moving through water can disturb plankton which produce a glowing wake.

Certain substances produce light when they are illuminated by more energetic radiation, a process known as fluorescence. Some substances emit light slowly after excitation by more energetic radiation. This is known as phosphorescence. Phosphorescent materials can also be excited by bombarding them with subatomic particles. Cathodoluminescence is one example. This mechanism is used in cathode-ray tube television sets and computer monitors.

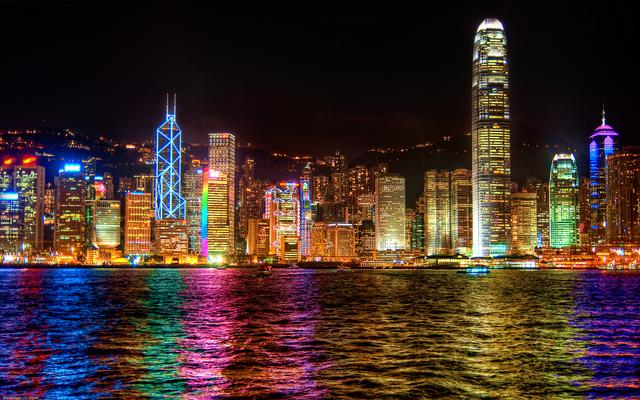
Hong Kong illuminated by colorful artificial lighting

Certain other mechanisms can produce light:

- Electroluminescence
- Scintillation
- Sonoluminescence
- Triboluminescence

When the concept of light is intended to include very-high-energy photons (gamma rays), additional generation mechanisms include:

- Particle–antiparticle annihilation
- Radioactive decay

== Measurement ==
Light is measured with two main alternative sets of units: radiometry consists of measurements of light power at all wavelengths, while photometry measures light with wavelength weighted with respect to a standardized model of human brightness perception. Photometry is useful, for example, to quantify Illumination (lighting) intended for human use.

The photometry units are different from most systems of physical units in that they take into account how the human eye responds to light. The cone cells in the human eye are of three types which respond differently across the visible spectrum and the cumulative response peaks at a wavelength of around 555 nm. Therefore, two sources of light which produce the same intensity (W/m^{2}) of visible light do not necessarily appear equally bright. The photometry units are designed to take this into account and therefore are a better representation of how "bright" a light appears to be than raw intensity. They relate to raw power by a quantity called luminous efficacy and are used for purposes like determining how to best achieve sufficient illumination for various tasks in indoor and outdoor settings. The illumination measured by a photocell sensor does not necessarily correspond to what is perceived by the human eye and without filters which may be costly, photocells and charge-coupled devices (CCD) tend to respond to some infrared, ultraviolet or both.

== Light pressure ==
Light exerts physical pressure on objects in its path, a phenomenon which can be deduced by Maxwell's equations, but can be more easily explained by the particle nature of light: photons strike and transfer their momentum. Light pressure is equal to the power of the light beam divided by c, the speed of light. Due to the magnitude of c, the effect of light pressure is negligible for everyday objects. For example, a one-milliwatt laser pointer exerts a force of about 3.3 piconewtons on the object being illuminated; thus, one could lift a US penny with laser pointers, but doing so would require about 30 billion 1-mW laser pointers. However, in nanometer-scale applications such as nanoelectromechanical systems (NEMS), the effect of light pressure is more significant and exploiting light pressure to drive NEMS mechanisms and to flip nanometer-scale physical switches in integrated circuits is an active area of research. At larger scales, light pressure can cause asteroids to spin faster, acting on their irregular shapes as on the vanes of a windmill. The possibility of making solar sails that would accelerate spaceships in space is also under investigation.

Although the motion of the Crookes radiometer was originally attributed to light pressure, this interpretation is incorrect; the characteristic Crookes rotation is the result of a partial vacuum. This should not be confused with the Nichols radiometer, in which the (slight) motion caused by torque (though not enough for full rotation against friction) is directly caused by light pressure. As a consequence of light pressure, Einstein in 1909 predicted the existence of "radiation friction" which would oppose the movement of matter. He wrote, "radiation will exert pressure on both sides of the plate. The forces of pressure exerted on the two sides are equal if the plate is at rest. However, if it is in motion, more radiation will be reflected on the surface that is ahead during the motion (front surface) than on the back surface. The backwardacting force of pressure exerted on the front surface is thus larger than the force of pressure acting on the back. Hence, as the resultant of the two forces, there remains a force that counteracts the motion of the plate and that increases with the velocity of the plate. We will call this resultant 'radiation friction' in brief."

Usually light momentum is aligned with its direction of motion. However, for example in evanescent waves momentum is transverse to direction of propagation.

== Historical theories about light, in chronological order ==
=== Classical Greece and Hellenism ===
In the fifth century BC, Empedocles postulated that everything was composed of four elements; fire, air, earth and water. He believed that goddess Aphrodite made the human eye out of the four elements and that she lit the fire in the eye which shone out from the eye making sight possible. If this were true, then one could see during the night just as well as during the day, so Empedocles postulated an interaction between rays from the eyes and rays from a source such as the sun.

In about 300 BC, Euclid wrote Optica, in which he studied the properties of light. Euclid postulated that light traveled in straight lines and he described the laws of reflection and studied them mathematically. He questioned that sight is the result of a beam from the eye, for he asks how one sees the stars immediately, if one closes one's eyes, then opens them at night. If the beam from the eye travels infinitely fast this is not a problem.

In 55 BC, Lucretius, a Roman who carried on the ideas of earlier Greek atomists, wrote that "The light & heat of the sun; these are composed of minute atoms which, when they are shoved off, lose no time in shooting right across the interspace of air in the direction imparted by the shove." (from On the nature of the Universe). Despite being similar to later particle theories, Lucretius's views were not generally accepted. Ptolemy (c. second century) wrote about the refraction of light in his book Optics.

=== Classical India ===
In ancient India, the Hindu schools of Samkhya and Vaisheshika, from around the early centuries AD developed theories on light. According to the Samkhya school, light is one of the five fundamental "subtle" elements (tanmatra) out of which emerge the gross elements. The atomicity of these elements is not specifically mentioned and it appears that they were actually taken to be continuous. The Vishnu Purana refers to sunlight as "the seven rays of the sun".

The Indian Buddhists, such as Dignāga in the fifth century and Dharmakirti in the seventh century, developed a type of atomism that is a philosophy about reality being composed of atomic entities that are momentary flashes of light or energy. They viewed light as being an atomic entity equivalent to energy.

=== Descartes ===
René Descartes (1596–1650) held that light was a mechanical property of the luminous body, rejecting the "forms" of Ibn al-Haytham and Witelo as well as the "species" of Roger Bacon, Robert Grosseteste and Johannes Kepler. In 1637 he published a theory of the refraction of light that assumed, incorrectly, that light traveled faster in a denser medium than in a less dense medium. Descartes arrived at this conclusion by analogy with the behavior of sound waves. Although Descartes was incorrect about the relative speeds, he was correct in assuming that light behaved like a wave and in concluding that refraction could be explained by the speed of light in different media.

Descartes is not the first to use the mechanical analogies but because he clearly asserts that light is only a mechanical property of the luminous body and the transmitting medium, Descartes's theory of light is regarded as the start of modern physical optics.

=== Particle theory ===
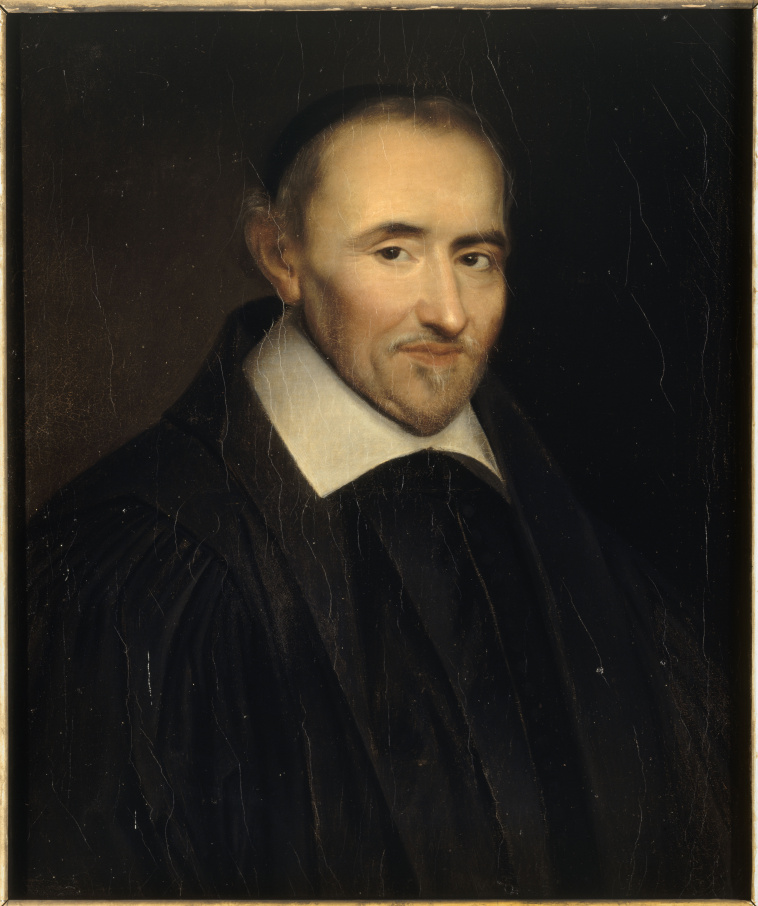
Pierre Gassendi

Pierre Gassendi (1592–1655), an atomist, proposed a particle theory of light which was published posthumously in the 1660s. Isaac Newton studied Gassendi's work at an early age and preferred his view to Descartes's theory of the plenum. He stated in his Hypothesis of Light of 1675 that light was composed of corpuscles (particles of matter) which were emitted in all directions from a source. One of Newton's arguments against the wave nature of light was that waves were known to bend around obstacles, while light traveled only in straight lines. He did, however, explain the phenomenon of the diffraction of light (which had been observed by Francesco Grimaldi) by allowing that a light particle could create a localized wave in the aether.

Newton's theory could be used to predict the reflection of light, but could only explain refraction by incorrectly assuming that light accelerated upon entering a denser medium because the gravitational pull was greater. Newton published the final version of his theory in his Opticks of 1704. His reputation helped the particle theory of light to hold sway during the eighteenth century. The particle theory of light led Pierre-Simon Laplace to argue that a body could be so massive that light could not escape from it. In other words, it would become what is now called a black hole. Laplace withdrew his suggestion later, after a wave theory of light became firmly established as the model for light (as has been explained, neither a particle or wave theory is fully correct). A translation of Newton's essay on light appears in The large scale structure of space-time, by Stephen Hawking and George F. R. Ellis.

The fact that light could be polarized was for the first time qualitatively explained by Newton using the particle theory. Étienne-Louis Malus in 1810 created a mathematical particle theory of polarization. Jean-Baptiste Biot in 1812 showed that this theory explained all known phenomena of light polarization. At that time the polarization was considered as the proof of the particle theory.

=== Wave theory ===
To explain the origin of colours, Robert Hooke (1635–1703) developed a "pulse theory" and compared the spreading of light to that of waves in water in his 1665 work Micrographia ("Observation IX"). In 1672 Hooke suggested that light's vibrations could be perpendicular to the direction of propagation. Christiaan Huygens (1629–1695) worked out a mathematical wave theory of light in 1678 and published it in his Treatise on Light in 1690. He proposed that light was emitted in all directions as a series of waves in a medium called the luminiferous aether. As waves are not affected by gravity, it was assumed that they slowed down upon entering a denser medium. Another supporter of the wave theory was Leonhard Euler. He argued in Nova Theoria lucis et colorum (1746) that diffraction could more easily be explained by a wave theory.

Christiaan Huygens

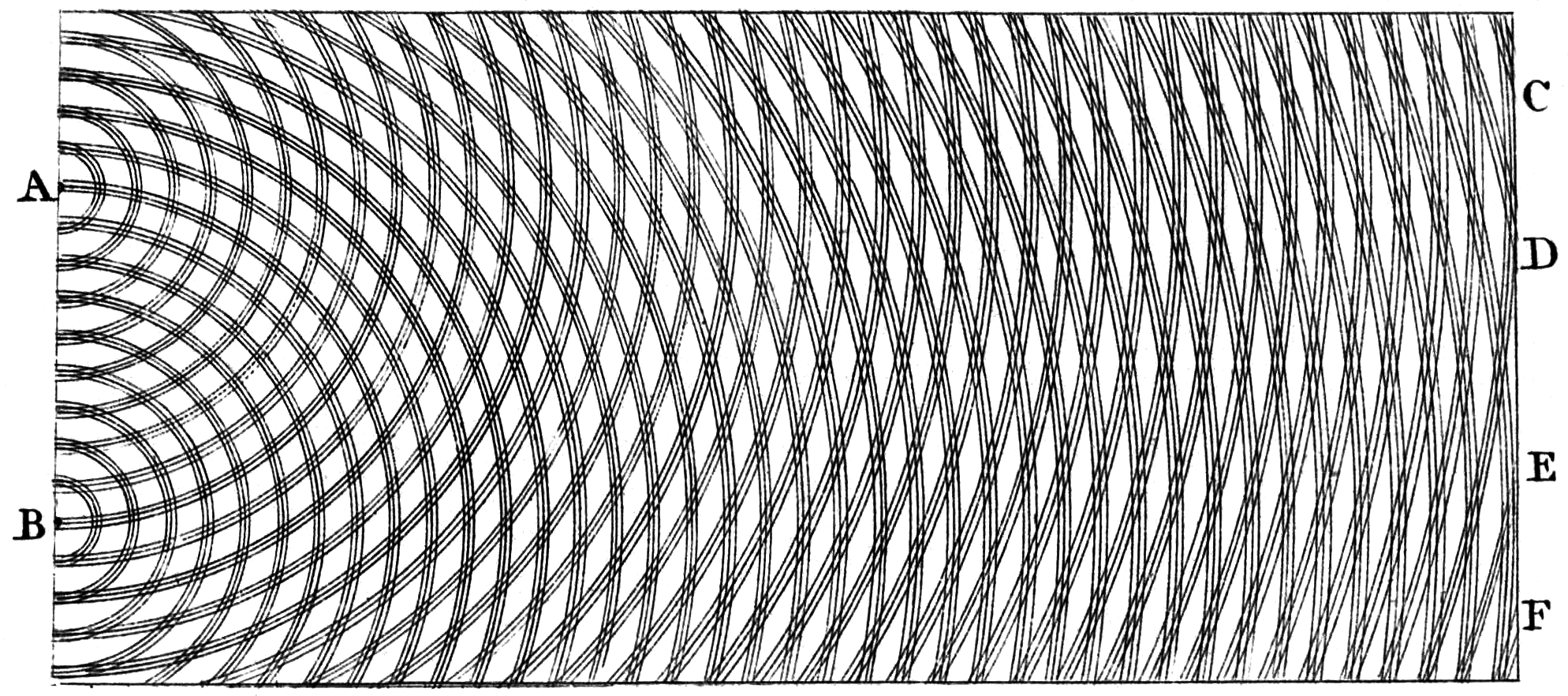
Thomas Young's sketch of water waves showing diffraction

The wave theory predicted that light waves could interfere with each other like sound waves (as noted around 1800 by Thomas Young). Young showed by means of numerous diffraction experiments that light behaved as waves. He first publicly stated his "general law" of interference in January 1802, in his book A Syllabus of a Course of Lectures on Natural and Experimental Philosophy:

But the general law, by which all these appearances are governed, may be very easily deduced from the interference of two coincident undulations, which either cooperate, or destroy each other, in the same manner as two musical notes produce an alternate intension and remission, in the beating of an imperfect unison.

He also proposed that different colors were caused by different wavelengths of light and explained color vision in terms of three-coloured receptors in the eye.

In 1816 André-Marie Ampère gave Augustin-Jean Fresnel an idea that the polarization of light can be explained by the wave theory if light were a transverse wave. Later, Fresnel independently worked out his own wave theory of light and presented it to the Académie des Sciences in 1817. Siméon Denis Poisson challenged Fresnel's model, claiming that it predicted a bright spot in the shadow behind a circular obstacle contrary to common sense. Dominique-François-Jean Arago created an experiment that showed the bright spot: Poisson's challenge became new evidence for the wave theory. In 1818, Young wrote to Arago suggesting that light must be transverse waves, not the longitudinal waves characteristic of sound. Fresnel took up the idea and was able to show via mathematical methods that polarization could be explained by a transverse wave theory of light with no longitudinal vibration.

The weakness of the wave theory was that light waves, like sound waves, would need a medium for transmission. The existence of the hypothetical substance luminiferous aether proposed by Huygens in 1678 was cast into strong doubt in the late nineteenth century by the Michelson–Morley experiment.

Newton's corpuscular theory implied that light would travel faster in a denser medium, while the wave theory of Huygens and others implied the opposite. At that time, the speed of light could not be measured accurately enough to decide which theory was correct. The first to make a sufficiently accurate measurement was Léon Foucault, in 1850. His result supported the wave theory, and the classical particle theory was finally abandoned (only to partly re-emerge in the twentieth century as photons in quantum theory).

=== Electromagnetic theory ===
A linearly polarized electromagnetic wave traveling along the z-axis, with E denoting the electric field and perpendicular B denoting magnetic field

In 1845, Michael Faraday discovered that the plane of polarization of linearly polarized light is rotated when the light rays travel along the magnetic field direction in the presence of a transparent dielectric, an effect now known as Faraday rotation. This was the first evidence that light was related to electromagnetism. In 1846 he speculated that light might be some form of disturbance propagating along magnetic field lines. Faraday proposed in 1847 that light was a high-frequency electromagnetic vibration, which could propagate even in the absence of a medium such as the ether.

Faraday's work inspired James Clerk Maxwell to study electromagnetic radiation and light. Maxwell discovered that self-propagating electromagnetic waves would travel through space at a constant speed, which happened to be equal to the previously measured speed of light. From this, Maxwell concluded that light was a form of electromagnetic radiation: he first stated this result in 1862 in On Physical Lines of Force. In 1873, he published A Treatise on Electricity and Magnetism, which contained a full mathematical description of the behavior of electric and magnetic fields, still known as Maxwell's equations. Soon after, Heinrich Hertz confirmed Maxwell's theory experimentally by generating and detecting radio waves in the laboratory and demonstrating that these waves behaved exactly like visible light, exhibiting properties such as reflection, refraction, diffraction and interference. Maxwell's theory and Hertz's experiments led directly to the development of modern radio, radar, television, electromagnetic imaging and wireless communications.

In the quantum theory, photons are seen as wave packets of the waves described in the classical theory of Maxwell. The quantum theory was needed to explain effects even with visual light that Maxwell's classical theory could not (such as spectral lines).

=== Quantum theory ===
In 1900 Max Planck, attempting to explain black-body radiation, suggested that although light was a wave, these waves could gain or lose energy only in finite amounts related to their frequency. Planck called these "lumps" of light energy "quanta" (from a Latin word for "how much"). In 1905, Albert Einstein used the idea of light quanta to explain the photoelectric effect and suggested that these light quanta had a "real" existence. In 1923 Arthur Holly Compton showed that the wavelength shift seen when low intensity X-rays scattered from electrons (so called Compton scattering) could be explained by a particle-theory of X-rays, but not a wave theory. In 1926 Gilbert N. Lewis named these light quanta particles photons.

Eventually quantum mechanics came to picture light as (in some sense) both a particle and a wave, and (in another sense) as a phenomenon which is neither a particle nor a wave (which actually are macroscopic phenomena, such as baseballs or ocean waves). Instead, under some approximations light can be described sometimes with mathematics appropriate to one type of macroscopic metaphor (particles) and sometimes another macroscopic metaphor (waves).

As in the case for radio waves and the X-rays involved in Compton scattering, physicists have noted that electromagnetic radiation tends to behave more like a classical wave at lower frequencies, but more like a classical particle at higher frequencies, but never completely loses all qualities of one or the other. Visible light, which occupies a middle ground in frequency, can easily be shown in experiments to be describable using either a wave or particle model, or sometimes both.

In 1924–1925, Satyendra Nath Bose showed that light followed different statistics from that of classical particles. With Einstein, they generalized this result for a whole set of integer spin particles called bosons (after Bose) that follow Bose–Einstein statistics. The photon is a massless boson of spin 1.

In 1927, Paul Dirac quantized the electromagnetic field. Pascual Jordan and Vladimir Fock generalized this process to treat many-body systems as excitations of quantum fields, a process with the misnomer of second quantization. And at the end of the 1940s a full theory of quantum electrodynamics was developed using quantum fields based on the works of Julian Schwinger, Richard Feynman, Freeman Dyson, and Shinichiro Tomonaga.

=== Quantum optics ===
John R. Klauder, George Sudarshan, Roy J. Glauber, and Leonard Mandel applied quantum theory to the electromagnetic field in the 1950s and 1960s to gain a more detailed understanding of photodetection and the statistics of light (see degree of coherence). This led to the introduction of the coherent state as a concept which addressed variations between laser light, thermal light, exotic squeezed states, etc. as it became understood that light cannot be fully described just referring to the electromagnetic fields describing the waves in the classical picture. In 1977, H. Jeff Kimble et al. demonstrated a single atom emitting one photon at a time, further compelling evidence that light consists of photons. Previously unknown quantum states of light with characteristics unlike classical states, such as squeezed light were subsequently discovered.

Development of short and ultrashort laser pulses—created by Q switching and modelocking techniques—opened the way to the study of what became known as ultrafast processes. Applications for solid state research (e.g. Raman spectroscopy) were found, and mechanical forces of light on matter were studied. The latter led to levitating and positioning clouds of atoms or even small biological samples in an optical trap or optical tweezers by laser beam. This, along with Doppler cooling and Sisyphus cooling, was the crucial technology needed to achieve the celebrated Bose–Einstein condensation.

Other remarkable results are the demonstration of quantum entanglement, quantum teleportation, and quantum logic gates. The latter are of much interest in quantum information theory, a subject which partly emerged from quantum optics, partly from theoretical computer science.

== Use for light on Earth ==
Sunlight provides the energy that green plants use to create sugars mostly in the form of starches, which release energy into the living things that digest them. This process of photosynthesis provides virtually all the energy used by living things. Some species of animals generate their own light, a process called bioluminescence. For example, fireflies use light to locate mates and vampire squid use it to hide themselves from prey.

== See also ==
- Ballistic photon
- Colour temperature
- Fermat's principle
- Huygens' principle
- Journal of Luminescence
- Light beam – in particular about light beams visible from the side
- Light Fantastic (TV series)
- Light mill
- List of light sources
- Luminescence: The Journal of Biological and Chemical Luminescence
- Spectroscopy
