= Boulevard (Canadian band) =

Canadian rock band

- Also known as: Blvd
- Origin: Calgary, Alberta, Canada
- Genres: Rock, arena rock, hard rock
- Years active: 1983–1991, 2014–present
- Labels: MCA Canada, MelodicRock Records, Rocktopia Records
- Members: Mark Holden; David Forbes; Andrew Johns; Cory Curtis; Randall Stoll
- Past members: Randy Gould; Randy Burgess; Jerry Adolphe; Tom Christiansen; Hans Sahlen; Dave Corman
- Website: https://www.facebook.com/boulevardcanada

Boulevard is a Canadian band (originally abbreviated Blvd) formed in 1983 in Calgary by Mark Holden (saxophone/vocals). After releasing two studio albums, they disbanded in 1991. They reunited 23 years later, in 2014, and played at Firefest in Nottingham, England. Later they also released two studio albums, in September 2017, and in April 2026.

== History ==
In 1983, saxophonist Mark Holden co-founded Thunder Road Studio in Calgary, Alberta. He started a studio project called Modern Minds using studio players in Calgary. In 1984, he asked Andrew Johns to join as keyboard player and lead vocalist, while redoing some of the old demos. Other members who made up the group were Randy Gould on guitar, Jerry Adolphe on drums, Hans Sahlen on bass, lead vocalist David Forbes and Holden on saxophone.

In 1984, they signed with CBS Records and traveled to Germany to make a video for the first single, "Rainy Day In London", and to perform on the television shows Ronny's Pop Show and Bananas. The single topped out at No. 45 on the Billboard charts in Germany, Switzerland, and Austria. Their performance of the song "Far From Over" was included in a compilation released by Ronny's Pop Show that year.

The group remained in Calgary until it signed a deal with MCA Records in 1988, and moved to Vancouver to procure management with the Bruce Allen talent agency. Sahlen stayed in Calgary and was replaced on bass by Randy Burgess.

In 1988, Boulevard recorded their debut album at Vancouver's Ocean Sound by producer Pierre 'Baz' Bazinet, and was mixed by rock producers Bob Rock and Mike Fraser. The album, BLVD., produced four singles with videos for "Never Give Up" and "Far From Over". The band gained exposure by touring Canada and opening for Glass Tiger. They also opened for Boston on the final leg of the band's Third Stage tour.

By 1990, Boulevard had revised their line-up with Thom Christiansen (formerly of Idle Eyes) on bass, and Randall Stoll on drums. They recorded Into the Street at Venture Studios in Vancouver with John Punter and, that year, released two singles in Canada. The band broke up in 1991.

In 2013, Boulevard reunited to play at Firefest 2014 in Nottingham. When they arrived in the UK, they were astonished to find that fans had traveled from all over the world to see them. The members decided to look at some previously unreleased songs. They added new material and had enough for an album.

On February 27, 2015, Boulevard went into The Warehouse Studio in Vancouver and filmed the DVD Boulevard - Live from Gastown, which included all five of the band's Canadian top 40 singles, as well as some tracks from the band's catalog, including some songs performed live in their entirety for the first time. By now, the band members were Holden, Stoll, Forbes, and Johns, with Corey Curtis on bass and David Corman on guitar.

On July 16, 2017, the band, now named 'Boulevard IV', released the first song from their reunion record, "Life Is A Beautiful Thing", which aired live on the Steve Price Rock Show on ArFM. The following day, Melodicrock.com announced the name of the new album as Luminescence. It was released on September 22, 2017.

During the COVID-19 pandemic, the band remotely performed songs as fundraisers for Food Banks Canada.

== Discography ==
Albums

- Blvd (1988), MCA Records
- Into the Street (1990), MCA Records
- IV: Luminescence (2017), MelodicRock Records
- Talk Without Speaking (2026), Aor Blvd Records

Singles

- "Rainy Day in London" (1984)
- "In the Twilight" (1988)
- "Never Give Up" (1988) CAN No. 23
- "Far From Over" (1988) CAN No. 26
- "Dream On" (1988) CAN No. 31
- "Lead Me On" (1990) CAN No. 21
- "Crazy Life" (1990) CAN No. 47
- "Need You Tonight" (1990)
- "Ready to Let Go" (2025)

DVDs

- Live from Gastown (2015), Rocktopia Records
