= Ballistic photon =

Unscattered particle

Ballistic light, also known as ballistic photons, refers to photons of light that travel through a turbid optical medium without being scattered.

When pulses of laser light pass through a turbid medium such as fog or body tissue, most of the photons are either scattered or absorbed. However, across short distances, a few photons pass through the scattering medium in straight lines. These coherent photons are referred to as ballistic photons. Photons that are slightly scattered, retaining some degree of coherence, are referred to as snake photons.

The aim of ballistic imaging modalities is to efficiently detect ballistic photons that carry useful information, while rejecting non-ballistic photons. To perform this task, specific characteristics of ballistic photons vs. non-ballistic photons are used, such as time of flight through coherence-gated imaging, collimation, wavefront propagation, and polarization. Slightly scattered "quasi-ballistic" photons are often measured as well, to increase the signal 'strength' (i.e., signal-to-noise ratio).

Ballistic photons have many applications, especially in high-resolution medical imaging systems. Ballistic scanners (using ultrafast time gates) and optical coherence tomography (OCT) (using the interferometry principle) are just two popular imaging systems that rely on ballistic photon detection to create diffraction-limited images. Advantages over other existing imaging modalities (e.g., ultrasound and magnetic resonance imaging) is that ballistic imaging can achieve a higher resolution in the order of 1 to 10 micro-meters, however it suffers from limited imaging depth.

Due to the exponential reduction of ballistic photons as thickness of the scattering medium increases, the images often have a low number of photons per pixel, resulting in shot noise. Digital image processing and noise reduction are often applied to reduce that noise.

== See also ==
- Medical optical imaging
