= IV: Luminescence =

Studio album by Boulevard
- Released: September 22, 2017
- Genre: Rock
- Length: 51:01
- Label: Melodic Rock Records
- Producer: Boulevard

Boulevard chronology
Into the Street (1990)	IV: Luminescence (2017)

IV: Luminescence is the third studio album and fourth overall release by the Canadian hard rock band Boulevard, released on September 22, 2017. The album was recorded at Warehouse Studio in Vancouver B.C and engineered by Eric Mosher, and Zak Blackstone, assisted by Matt Harvey and Ryan Enockson. Additional overdubs were recorded at Westsonic Music, Vancouver B.C.and engineered by Dave Corman. Tracks were also recorded at Abbey Road Studios in London U.K. and engineered by Chris Bolster, assisted by John Barrett.

== Track listing ==
All tracks are written by Boulevard

No.	Title	Length
1.	"Out of the Blue"	3:56
2.	"Life is a Beautiful Thing"	4:11
3.	"Laugh or Cry"	4:48
4.	"What I'd Give"	5:15
5.	"Come Together"	4:49
6.	"Runnin' Low"	4:36
7.	"I Can't Tell You Why"	4:03
8.	"Confirmation"	4:40
9.	"Slippin' Away"	5:45
10.	"What Are You Waiting For"	4:12
11.	"Don't Stop the Music"	4:36

== Personnel ==
- David Forbes - lead vocals
- Dave Corman - guitars
- Andrew Johns - keyboards, lead vocals, and background vocals
- Mark Holden - saxophone
- Cory Curtis - bass
- Randall Stoll - drums and percussion
