= Institute for Biodiagnostics =

Canadian research laboratory focusing on diagnostic technologies

- Established: 1992
- Laboratory type: research laboratory
- Field of research: Biotechnology
- Staff: 150
- Location: 435 Ellice Avenue; Winnipeg, Manitoba; R3B 1Y6; 49.8939°N 97.1506°W
- Operating agency: National Research Council

The National Research Council Institute for Biodiagnostics (NRC-IBD) is a research laboratory located in Winnipeg, Manitoba, Canada, and operated by the National Research Council. It was established in 1992 to research and develop noninvasive medical diagnostic technologies to increase prospects for prevention, earlier diagnosis, improved treatment and prognosis of diseases.

Located adjacent to the University of Winnipeg campus in downtown Winnipeg, NRC-IBD also has satellite institutes in Halifax and Calgary.

NRC-IBD conducts its research in partnership with medical schools, universities, other research organizations, and industry. Its research projects fall into the following six programs: Cancer research; cardiovascular disease research; IT-based decision technology; medical photonics; MR research and technology development; and neuroscience research.

Its impact on Winnipeg's economy amounts to $30 million a year.

== History ==
Prior to the NRC, the site of the building was the location of St. Paul's College, which had occupied the former 1882 Manitoba College building since 1931.

In July 1983, Member of Parliament Lloyd Axworthy announced that construction would soon begin on a $41-million National Research Council facility called "Science Place Canada," which would include an Institute for Manufacturing Technology. During the early stages of construction, however, following the change in government per the 1984 election, the new the administration of Brian Mulroney announced that the planned institute would be cut due to budgetary issues (particularly given the recession), though construction would continue.

While the building opened in 1985, it did not have any major tenants for years to follow. (A small group of NRC employees located at the facility at the time were titled the Canadian Institute of Industrial Technology.) Finally, in 1992, the NRC established the Institute for Biodiagnostics, initially employing just 25 people.

In 2005, the lab expanded to a second building of 40,000 square feet (3,700 m^{2}), where the NRC Centre for the Commercialization of Biomedical Technology (NRC-CCBT) was established as an incubator facility for start-up firms in Manitoba in the field of life sciences. Major tenants include the International Centre for Infectious Diseases (ICID), Biomedical Commercialization Canada Inc. (BCC), Health Media Network, and Acrodex.

In 2011 through 2012, federal budget cuts led to various layoffs of scientists and researchers at the NRC-IBD. Working to restructure the agency, the federal government announced its plans to close the building and sell it.
