= Spectroscopic optical coherence tomography =

Optical imaging technique

Spectroscopic optical coherence tomography (SOCT) is an optical imaging and sensing technique, which provides localized spectroscopic information of a sample based on the principles of optical coherence tomography (OCT) and low coherence interferometry. The general principles behind SOCT arise from the large optical bandwidths involved in OCT, where information on the spectral content of backscattered light can be obtained by detection and processing of the interferometric OCT signal. SOCT signal can be used to quantify depth-resolved spectra to retrieve the concentration of tissue chromophores (e.g., hemoglobin and bilirubin), characterize tissue light scattering, and used as a functional contrast enhancement for conventional OCT imaging.

== Theory ==
The following discussion of techniques for quantitatively obtaining localized optical properties using SOCT is a summary of the concepts discussed in Bosscharrt et al.

=== Localized spectroscopic information ===
The general form of the detected OCT interferogram is written as:

$i_d=|E_s|^2+|E_r|^2+2 \{E_sE_r \cos(k2d)\}$

Where, $E_s$ and $E_r$ are the fields returning from sample and reference arm, respectively, with wavenumber $k = 2 \pi / \lambda$ with $\lambda$ the wavelength. Further, $2d$ is the optical path length difference so that $d$ is the assigned depth location in the tissue. Both the spatial domain and spectral domain descriptions of the collected OCT signal, can be related by Fourier transformation:

$i_d(2d)=|\mathcal{F}\{i_d(k)\}|$

where $\mathcal{F}$ is the Fourier transform. However, due to the wavelength dependence with depth for both scattering and absorption in tissue, direct Fourier transform cannot be applied to obtain localized spectroscopic information from the OCT signal. For this reason, a time-frequency analysis method must be applied.

==== Time-frequency analysis methods ====
Time-frequency analysis allows for extraction of information of both time and frequency components of a signal. In most SOCT applications a continuous short-time Fourier transform (STFT) method is used,

$\text{STFT}(k,d;w)=\int_{-\infty}^{\infty}i_d(d')w(d-d';\Delta d)e^{-ikd'}d(d')$

where $w$ is a spatially confined windowing function that extracts spatially-localized frequency information by suppressing information from outside of the window, commonly a Gaussian distribution, centered around $d$ with width $\Delta d$. As a result, there exists an inherent trade-off between spatial and frequency resolution using the STFT method.

A wavelet transform (WT) approach may also be considered. Using both a series of function localized in both real and Fourier space from the complex window function w, by translations and dilations

$\text{WT}(k,d)=\int_{-\infty}^{\infty}(d')w\bigg(\frac{d-d'}{\kappa}\bigg)d(d')$

Where $\kappa$ is the scaling factor, which dilates or compress the wavelet $w$. In this case, the physical process can be considered as an array of band-filters with constant relative bandwidth to the center frequency, using short windows at high frequencies and long windows at low frequencies. Unlike the STFT, the WT method is not constrained by constraint bandwidth and may adapt the window size to a desired frequency. For this method the tradeoff is this between time and frequency resolutions.

Bilinear transforms may be applied, where under the right conditions have a reduced resolution penalty. For SOCT purposes the Wigner distribution:

$\text{WD}(k,d)=\int_{-\infty}^{\infty}i_d(d+d')i_d*(d-d')e^{-ikd'}d(d')$

can be used to extract structural knowledge of samples from time-localized information contained within the cross-terms. The Wigner distribution applies a Fourier transform to the autocorrelation of the OCT interferogram. The drawback of this method lies in its quadratic nature, contained in its interference terms. Separation between the two overlapping signal terms is challenging as this information is contained within the interference terms. For time-frequency analysis, the WD effectively suppresses the interference terms and as a result compromises joint time-frequency resolution with the level of suppression of the interference terms.

=== Quantitative determination of optical properties ===
The time-frequency analysis methods described above, result in a wavelength resolved power spectrum $S$ as a function of depth $d$. Assuming the first Born approximation, we can describe $S(d)$ using Beer's law:

$S(d)=\xi \cdot \mu_{b,NA}e^{-2\mu_{OCT}d}$

$\mu_{OCT}$ is the OCT signal attenuation coefficient and the factor 2 accounts for the double pass attenuation from depth $d$. The parameters $\xi$ and $\mu_{b,NA}$ determine the amplitude of $S(d)$ at d = 0. These system-dependent parameters are defined such that with $S_0$ the source power spectrum incident on the sample and T the axial PSF. The backscattering coefficient, $\mu_{b,NA}$ is sample dependent and is discussed in further detail below.

From the experimentally determined value of the OCT attenuation coefficient can be further expressed as:

$\mu_{OCT}=\mu_{t}=\mu_{s}+\mu_{a}$

with the total attenuation coefficient $\mu_{t}$, being the sum of both the scattering coefficient $\mu_{s}$ and the absorption coefficient $\mu_{a}$. The backscattering coefficient is both sample and source dependent and defined as:

$\mu_{b,NA}=\mu_{s}\cdot 2 \pi\textstyle \int_{\pi-NA}^{\pi} p(\theta)\sin\theta d \theta$

Where $p(y)$ is the scattering phase function, integrated over the numerical aperture $NA$.

The backscattering coefficient may be experimentally determined as long as a full understanding of zeta. Commonly zeta is measured by separate calibration with a sample having a known backscattering coefficient defined by Mie theory.

=== Separation of μ_{s} and μ_{a} ===
Several approaches have been used to effectively isolate the individual contributions of absorption ($\mu_{a}$) and scattering ($\mu_{s}$) from the overall OCT signal attenuation ($\mu_{OCT}$)

One method is by least-squares fitting, where the scattering dependence on wavelength with a power law. In this approach the absorption spectrum is regarded as the total absorption contribution overall known chromophores, with a least-squares fitting to the measured attenuation values.

$\mu_{OCT}=a \cdot \lambda^{-b}\textstyle \sum_{i} \displaystyle (c_i \mu_{a,i})$

The first term on the right represents the scattering component with a scaling factor $a$ and scatter power $b$, and the second term modeling the total absorption overall chromophores $i$ with individual contribution $c_i$. A limitation of this method is that the localization of present chromophores and their absorption properties need to be known to be effective.

Similarly another common approach is simply though calibration measurements, if the absorption coefficient of a scattering sample can be obtained through a separate calibration measurement, then isolating the scattering coefficient is pretty straight forward. One problem with this method is it assumes that tissue scattering is equal across various tissue regions, but if different structures have different absorption parameters it would just throw off the measurements.

Finally for certain applications, the real and imaginary part of the complex refractive index may be used to isolate the individual contributions from both absorption and scattering. using Kramers-Kronig (KK) relations. This is because the imaginary part of the refractive index can be tied to the absorption spectra using Kramer-Kronig relations. Robles et al. showed it was possible to separate the necessary contributions from the real part of the refractive index from a nonlinear dispersion phase term in the OCT signal.

=== Accuracy ===
The overall accuracy of SOCT to isolate the localized optical spectra is limited by several factors:

- First, the number of acquisitions – averaging and multiple integrations are critical for valid measurements due to the presence of speckle noise. But this value reduces with the square root of the number of independent scans in the averaging.
- Due to losses in spectral resolution sample inhomogeneity can be a factor, and there are sensitivity issues with system NA and spectrometer roll off that also affect both accuracy and resolution.
