= Luminescence (journal) =

- Discipline: Biochemistry
- Language: English
- Edited by: Yi Lv

Publication details
- Former name(s): Journal of Bioluminescence and Chemiluminescence
- History: 1986-present
- Publisher: John Wiley & Sons
- Frequency: Monthly
- Open access: Hybrid
- Impact factor: 2.464 (2020)

Standard abbreviations
- ISO 4: Luminescence

Indexing
- CODEN: LUMIFC
- ISSN: 1522-7235 (print); 1522-7243 (web)
- LCCN: sn99047451
- OCLC no.: 488597914

Links
- Journal homepage; Online access; Online archive

Luminescence: The Journal of Biological and Chemical Luminescence is a monthly peer-reviewed scientific journal publishing original scientific papers, short communications, technical notes, and reviews on fundamental and applied aspects of all forms of luminescence, including bioluminescence, chemiluminescence, electrochemiluminescence, sonoluminescence, triboluminescence, fluorescence, time-resolved fluorescence, and phosphorescence. The current editor-in-chief is Yi Lv (Sichuan University). It was established in 1986 by John Wiley & Sons as the Journal of Bioluminescence and Chemiluminescence and obtained its current title in 1999.

== Abstracting and indexing ==
Luminescence is abstracted and indexed in:

- Elsevier BIOBASE
- Biochemistry & Biophysics Citation Index
- Biological Abstracts
- BIOSIS Previews
- CAB Abstracts
- Chemical Abstracts Service
- Current Contents/Life Sciences
- Index Medicus/MEDLINE
- Inspec
- METADEX
- Science Citation Index
- Scopus
- VINITI Database RAS
- The Zoological Record

According to the Journal Citation Reports, the journal has a 2020 impact factor of 2.464, ranking it 55th out of 87 journals in the category of "Chemistry, Analytical".

== Highest cited papers ==
According to the Web of Science, the most-cited papers published in Luminescence are:

1. "The red-edge effects: 30 years of exploration", Volume 17, Issue 1, Jan-Feb 2002, Pages: 19–42, Demchenko AP.
2. "Imaging of light emission from the expression of luciferases in living cells and organisms: a review", Volume 17, Issue 1, Jan-Feb 2002, Pages: 43–74, Greer LF, Szalay AA.
3. "Analytical applications of flow injection with chemiluminescence detection - a review", Volume 16, Issue 1, Jan-Feb 2001, Pages: 1-23, Fletcher P, Andrew KN, Calokerinos AC, et al.
4. "Reporter cell lines are useful tools for monitoring biological activity of nuclear receptor ligands", Volume 16, Issue 2, Mar-Apr 2001, Pages: 153–158, Balaguer P, Boussioux AM, Demirpence E, et al.
