= ISO 25178 =

ISO collection of international standards

ISO 25178: Geometrical Product Specifications (GPS) – Surface texture: areal is an International Organization for Standardization collection of international standards relating to the analysis of 3D areal surface texture.

== Structure of the standard ==
Documents constituting the standard:

- Part 1: Indication of surface texture
- Part 2: Terms, definitions and surface texture parameters
- Part 3: Specification operators
- Part 6: Classification of methods for measuring surface texture
- Part 70: Material measures
- Part 71: Software measurement standards
- Part 72: XML file format x3p
- Part 600: Metrological characteristics for areal-topography measuring methods
- Part 601: Nominal characteristics of contact (stylus) instruments
- Part 602: Nominal characteristics of non-contact (confocal chromatic probe) instruments
- Part 603: Nominal characteristics of non-contact (phase-shifting interferometric microscopy) instruments
- Part 604: Nominal characteristics of non-contact (coherence scanning interferometry) instruments
- Part 605: Nominal characteristics of non-contact (point autofocus probe) instruments
- Part 606: Nominal characteristics of non-contact (focus variation) instruments
- Part 607: Nominal characteristics of non-contact (confocal microscopy) instruments
- Part 700: Calibration of surface texture measuring instruments [NWIP]
- Part 701: Calibration and measurement standards for contact (stylus) instruments

Other documents might be proposed in the future but the structure is now almost defined. Part 600 will replace the common part found in all other parts. When revised, parts 60x will be reduced to only contain descriptions specific to the instrument technology.

== New features ==
It is the first international standard taking into account the specification and measurement of 3D surface texture. In particular, the standard defines 3D surface texture parameters and the associated specification operators. It also describes the applicable measurement technologies, calibration methods, together with the physical calibration standards and calibration software that are required.

A major new feature incorporated into the standard is coverage of non-contact measurement methods, already commonly used by industry, but up until now lacking a standard to support quality audits within the framework of ISO 9000. For the first time, the standard brings 3D surface metrology methods into the official domain, following 2D profilometric methods that have been subject to standards for over 30 years. The same thing applies to measurement technologies that are not restricted to contact measurement (with a diamond point stylus), but can also be optical, such as chromatic confocal gauges and interferometric microscopes.

=== New definitions ===
The ISO 25178 standard is considered by TC213 as first and foremost providing a redefinition of the foundations of surface texture, based upon the principle that nature is intrinsically 3D. It is anticipated that future work will extend these new concepts into the domain of 2D profilometric surface texture analysis, requiring a total revision of all current surface texture standards (ISO 4287, ISO 4288, ISO 1302, ISO 11562, ISO 12085, ISO 13565, etc.)

A new vocabulary is imposed:

- S filter: filter eliminating the smallest scale elements from the surface (or of the shortest wavelength for a linear filter)
- L filter: filter eliminating the largest scale elements from the surface (or of the longest wavelength for a linear filter)
- F operator: operator suppressing nominal form.
- Primary surface: surface obtained after S filtering.
- S-F surface: surface obtained after applying an F operator to the primary surface.
- S-L surface: surface obtained after applying an L filter to the S-F surface.
- Nesting index: index corresponding to the cut-off wavelength of a linear filter, or to the scale of the structuring element of a morphological filter. Under 25178, industry-specific taxonomies such as roughness vs waviness are replaced by the more general concept of "scale limited surface" and "cut-off" by "nesting index".

The new available filters are described in the series of technical specifications included in ISO 16610. These filters include: the Gaussian filter, the spline filter, robust filters, morphological filters, wavelet filters, cascading filters, etc.

== Parameters ==
=== Generalities ===
3D areal surface texture parameters are written with the capital letter S (or V) followed by a suffix of one or two small letters. They are calculated on the entire surface and no more by averaging estimations calculated on a number of base lengths, as is the case for 2D parameters. In contrast with 2D naming conventions, the name of a 3D parameter does not reflect the filtering context. For example, Sa always appears regardless of the surface, whereas in 2D there is Pa, Ra or Wa depending on whether the profile is a primary, roughness or waviness profile.

=== Height parameters ===
These parameters involve only the statistical distribution of height values along the z axis.

Parameter	Description
Sq	Root mean square height of the surface
Ssk	Skewness of height distribution
Sku	Kurtosis of height distribution
Sp	Maximum height of peaks
Sv	Maximum height of valleys
Sz	Maximum height of the surface
Sa	Arithmetical mean height of the surface

=== Spatial parameters ===
These parameters involve the spatial periodicity of the data, specifically its direction.

Parameter	Description
Sal	Fastest decay auto-correlation rate
Str	Texture aspect ratio of the surface
Std	Texture direction of the surface

=== Hybrid parameters ===
These parameters relate to the spatial shape of the data.

Parameter	Description
Sdq	Root mean square gradient of the surface
Sdr	Developed area ratio

=== Functions and related parameters ===
These parameters are calculated from the material ratio curve (Abbott-Firestone curve).

Parameter	Description
Smr	Surface bearing area ratio
Sdc	Height of surface bearing area ratio
Sxp	Peak extreme height
Vm	Material volume at a given height
Vv	Void volume at a given height
Vmp	Material volume of peaks
Vmc	Material volume of the core
Vvc	Void volume of the core
Vvv	Void volume of the valleys

=== Parameters related to segmentation ===
These feature parameters are derived from a segmentation of the surface into motifs (dales and hills). Segmentation is carried out using a watershed method.

Parameter	Description
Spd	Density of peaks
Spc	Arithmetic mean peak curvature
S10z	10 point height
S5p	5 point peak height
S5v	5 point valley height
Sda	Closed dales area
Sha	Closed hills area
Sdv	Closed dales volume
Shv	Closed hills volume

== Software ==
A consortium of several companies started to work in 2008 on a free implementation of 3D surface texture parameters. The consortium, called OpenGPS later focused its efforts on an XML file format (X3P) that was published under the ISO standard ISO 25178-72. Several commercial packages provide part or all of the parameters defined in ISO 25178, such as MountainsMap from Digital Surf, SPIP from Image Metrology , TrueMap 6 from TrueGage , as well as the open source Gwyddion.

== Instruments ==
Part 6 of the standard divides the usable technologies for 3D surface texture measurement into three families:

1. Topographical instruments: contact and non-contact 3D profilometers, interferometric and confocal microscopes, structured light projectors, stereoscopic microscopes, etc.
2. Profilometric instruments: contact and non-contact 2D profilometers, line triangulation lasers, etc.
3. Instruments functioning by integration: pneumatic measurement, capacitive, by optical diffusion, etc.

and defines each of these technologies.

Next, the standard explores a number of these technologies in detail and dedicates two documents to each of them:

- Part 6xx: nominal characteristics of the instrument
- Part 7xx: calibration of the instrument

=== Contact profilometer ===
Parts 601 and 701 describe the contact profilometer, using a diamond point to measure the surface with the assistance of a lateral scanning device.

=== Chromatic confocal gauge ===
Part 602 describes this type of non-contact profilometer, incorporating a single point white light chromatic confocal sensor. The operating principle is based upon the chromatic dispersion of the white light source along the optical axis, via a confocal device, and the detection of the wavelength that is focused on the surface by a spectrometer.

=== Coherence scanning interferometry ===
Part 604 describes a class of optical surface measurement methods wherein the localization of interference fringes during a scan of optical path length provides a means to determine surface characteristics such as topography, transparent film structure, and optical properties. The technique encompasses instruments that use spectrally broadband, visible sources (white light) to achieve interference fringe localization). CSI uses either fringe localization alone or in combination with interference fringe phase.

=== Focus variation ===
Part 606 describes this type of non-contact areal based method. The operating principle is based on a microscope optics with limited depth of field and a CCD camera. By scanning in vertical direction several images with different focus are gathered. This data is then used to calculate a surface data set for roughness measurement.

== See also ==
- Outline of metrology and measurement
- Geometrical Product Specification and Verification
- Surface roughness
- Waviness
- Surface metrology
- MountainsMap: surface texture analysis software
- ISO 16610: filters for surface texture
