= MountainsMap =

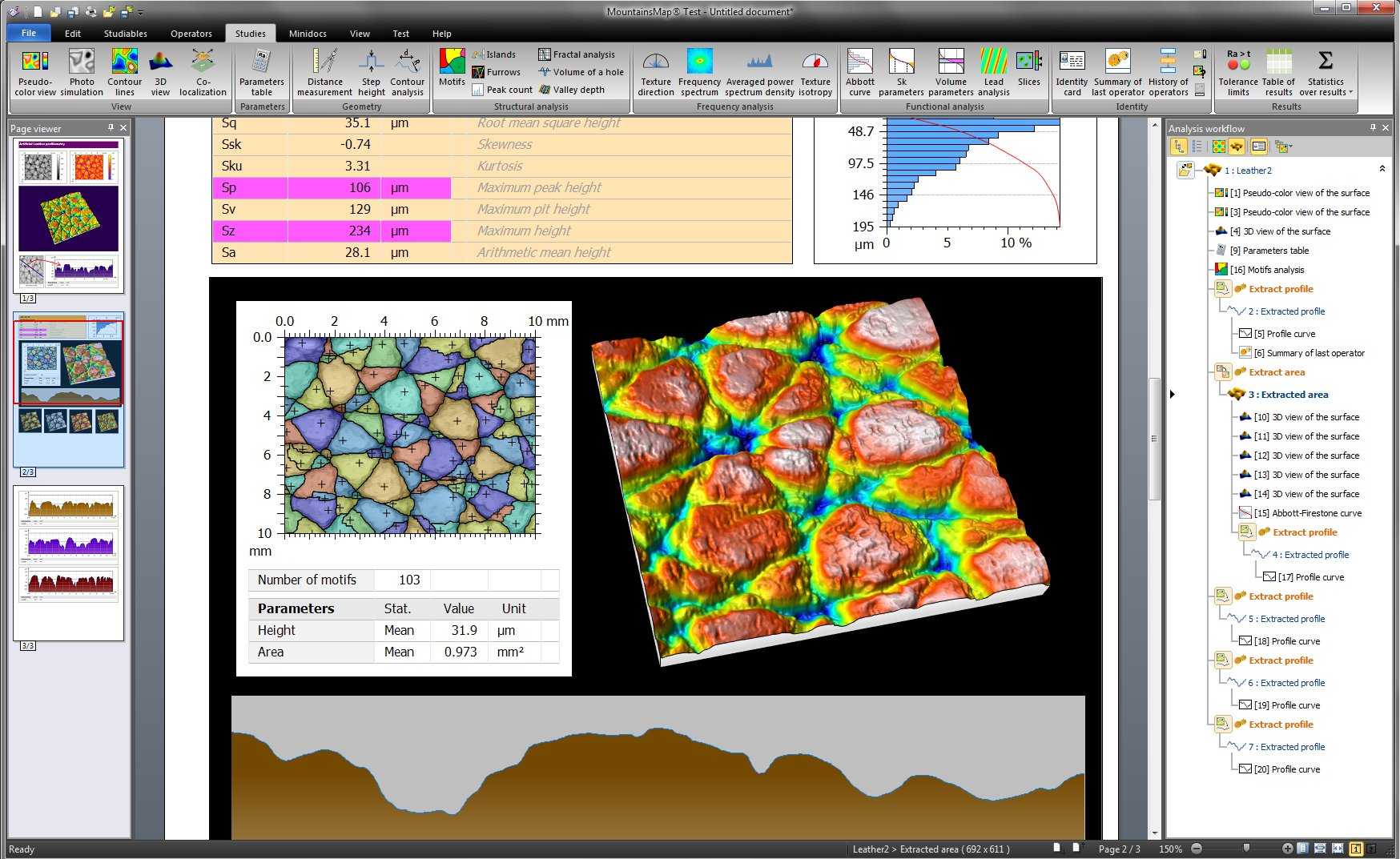
- MountainsMap 7.0 Graphical user interface (microtopography of an artificial leather texture from a car dashboard)
- Developer: Digital Surf
- Initial release: September 1996
- Stable release: 10.0 / June 1, 2023
- Operating system: Windows
- Platform: PC
- Type: Scientific Software
- License: Proprietary
- Website: www.digitalsurf.com

Mountains is an image analysis and surface metrology software platform published by the company Digital Surf. Its core is "micro-topography", the science of studying surface texture and form in 3D at the microscopic scale. The software is dedicated to profilometers, 3D light microscopes ("MountainsMap"), scanning electron microscopes ("MountainsSEM") and scanning probe microscopes ("MountainsSPIP").

== Integration by instrument manufacturers ==
The main editor's distribution channel is OEM, through the integration of MountainsMap by most profiler and microscope manufacturers, usually under their respective brands.

== Compatibility ==
- Mountains native file format is the SURF format (.SUR extension).
- Mountains is compatible with most instruments of the market capable of supplying images or topography.
- Mountains complies to the ISO 25178 standard on 3D surface texture evaluation and offers the profile and areal filters defined in ISO 16610.
- The metrology reports are generated in proprietary format but can also be exported to PDF and RTF formats.
- Mountains is available in English, Brazilian Portuguese, simplified Chinese, French, German, Italian, Japanese, Korean, Polish, Russian and Spanish.

== Data types ("studiables") accepted ==
Vocabulary:

- $x,y,z$ refer to space coordinates, $t$ to the time, and $i$ to an intensity. $A=f(B)$ means $A$ is function of $B$, $B$ referring usually to space coordinates and $A$ to a scalar.
- In Mountains's vocabulary, these data types are referred to as "studiables".

Most studiables have a dynamic (time-series) equivalent, e.g., the surface studiable $z=f(x,y)$ used to study topography has an associate studiable Series of Surfaces $z=f(x,y,t)$ used to study the evolution of topography (e.g., heat distortion of a surface).

Mountains analyses the following basic data types:

| Data type | Example Image | Formula | Application | Has a time-dynamic equivalent ("series of ..." ) | Instrument |
|---|---|---|---|---|---|
| Profile | | $z=f(x)$ | | Yes | stylus 2D profilometer. |
| Parametric profile | | $(x,z) = f(t)$ | "Contour": Form analysis in 2D | No | Contour instruments |
| Surface | | $z=f(x,y)$ | Surface Topography | Yes | Optical or contact 3D profilometer |
| Shell | | | Analysis of Free Form Surfaces | No | Multiple axis profilometers, tomographs |
| Point clouds | | | Import of non-meshed shells and surfaces | No | Scanning devices |
| True color image | | $(R,G,B) = f(x,y)$ | True color or gray-level image | Yes | Scanning Electron Microscope, Light microscope, simple camera |
| Surface-image | | $(Z,R,G,B) = f(x,y)$ | Topography and true color image | No | optical profilometer providing the topography with the image |
| Multi-channel image | | $(i1,i2,...,in) = f(x,y)$ | | No | Atomic force microscope, spectrum analyzer, correlative imaging using heterogeneous sources |
| Multi-channel cube | | $(i1,i2,...,in) = f(x,y,z)$ | | No | FIB-SEM, Confocal-Raman tomography |
| Force curves | | | | Yes | Atomic force microscopes |
| Spectrum | | | $(i) = f(lambda)$ | Yes | Spectrometer |
| Hyperspectral image | | | $i = f(x,y,lambda)$ | No | X-Y scanning spectrometer, hyperspectral camera, SEM/EDX, Raman, Cathodoluminescence... |

== History of versions ==
- Digital Surf launched their first (2D) surface analysis software package in 1990 for MS-DOS ("DigiProfil 1.0"), then their first 3D surface analysis package in 1991 for Macintosh II ("DigiSurface 1.0").
- Version 1.0 of MountainsMap was launched in September 1996, introducing a change in the name after a move of the editor to Windows from MsDos and Macintosh platforms.
- Version 5.0 introduced the management of multi-layers images. It was a move to Confocal microscopy (analysis of topography+color as a single object as opposed to separate objects in former versions), and to SPM image analysis (analysis of topography+current, topography+phase, topography+force as a single image).

Mountains 6 - Makalu 2010 event logo

- Version 6.0 completed the specialization of the platform per instrument type. For Version 6.0 the company teamed with a group of alpinists to launch the new version at the summit of the Makalu mountain. A special logo was created for this marketing event. The expedition was successful and Alexia Zuberer, a French and Swiss mountaineer was then the first Swiss woman to reach the summit of the Makalu, Sandrine de Choudens, a French PhD in chemistry being the first French woman to succeed
- Version 7.0 was unveiled in September 2012 at the European Microscopy Congress in Manchester, UK. It expanded the list of instruments supported, in particular with new Scanning electron microscope 3D reconstruction software and hyperspectral data analysis (such as Raman and FT-IR hyperspectral cube analysis).
- Version 7.2 (February 2015) introduces near real-time 3D topography reconstruction for scanning electron microscopes
- Version 7.3 (January 2016) adds fast colorization of scanning electron microscope images based on object-oriented image segmentation.
- Version 7.4 (January 2017) offers 3D reconstruction from a single SEM image, and enhanced 3D printing
- Version 8.0 (June 2019) is the successor of both Mountains 7.4 and SPIP 6.7 software packages ("SPIP" standing for "Scanning Probe Image Processor") after the acquisition by Digital Surf of the Danish company Image Metrology A/S, the editor of SPIP. Version 8.0 also introduces the analysis of free form surfaces, called "Shells" in the software.
- Version 9.0 (June 2021) completes the "shells" (free form surfaces) with surface texture analysis adapted from the ISO 25178 parameters already calculated on the standard surfaces. It also comes with a new product line, "MountainsSpectral", dedicated to the chemical mapping of elements in both 2D (images of chemical composition) and 3D (multi-channel tomography of chemical composition), with applications such as FIB-SEM EDX (X-Ray analysis coupled with focused ion beam tomography) or confocal Raman (Raman analysis in confocal microscopy)
- Version 10.0 (June 2023) completes the list of supported microscopes with Light Microscopes, and introduces new features such as CAD-comparison of free-form surfaces ("shells"), aspherics lens analysis.

== Instruments supported ==
| Version | Instruments supported | Specific functions |
|---|---|---|
| MountainsMap Profile | 2D Profilometers | ISO 25178 surface texture parameters Roughness, Waviness, Contour analysis |
| MountainsMap Topography | 3D Profilometers based on single point sensors (stylus contact, chromatic non-contact) | ISO 25178 Surface topography parameters 3D surface topography rendering Sensor range expansion by vertical patching |
| MountainsMap Imaging Topography | White light interferometers Confocal Microscopes; Fringe projection profilometers | Management of missing/bad data points Field expansion by stitching 3D true-color management (topography+color) |
| MountainsSEM | Scanning electron microscopes | 3D reconstruction from a stereo pair 3D reconstruction using a 4-quadrant detector semi-automatic colorization |
| MountainsSPIP | Atomic force microscopes Scanning tunneling microscopes | Multi-Channel SPM image management Force curve analysis |
| MountainsSpectral | Cathodoluminescence microscopes | Hyperspectral analysis |
| MountainsLab | All of the previous | Correlative microscopy (colocalization of images from heterogeneous microscope types) |

== See also ==
- Gwyddion (software)
- ImageJ
