= ISO 16610 =

ISO 16610: Geometrical product specifications (GPS) – Filtration is a standard series on filters for surface texture, and provides guidance on the use of these filters in various applications. Filters are used in surface texture in order reduce the bandwidth of analysis in order to obtain functional correlation with physical phenomena such as friction, wear, adhesion, etc. For example, filters are used to separate roughness and waviness from the primary profile, or to create a multiscale decomposition in order to identify the scale at which a phenomenon occurs. Historically, the first roughness measuring instruments - stylus profilometer - used to have electronic filters made of capacitors and resistors that filtered out low frequencies in order to retain frequencies that represent roughness. Later, digital filters replaced analog filters and international standards such as ISO 11562 for the Gaussian filter were published.

== Filter toolbox for surface texture ==
Today, a full set of filters is described in the ISO 16610 standard series. This standard is part of the GPS standards on Geometrical Product Specification and Verification, developed by ISO TC 213.

== Filter matrix ==
ISO 16610 is composed of two families of documents, one for profiles (open and closed) and one for surfaces. A general introduction is provided in:

- ISO 16610-1: Overview and basic concepts (published in 2015)

=== Profile filters ===
Profile filters are defined for open profiles, measured along a line by profilometers and expressed as z=f(x), as well as for closed profiles, measured around a circular component by roundness instruments and expressed as radius=f(angle). Most of these standards were first published as a Technical Specification (TS) and later converted to International Standards or withdrawn.

Parts related to profile filters are:

- ISO 16610-20: Linear profile filters: Basic concepts (published in 2015)
- ISO 16610-21: Linear profile filters: Gaussian filters (published in 2011)
- ISO 16610-22: Linear profile filters: Spline filters (published in 2015)
- ISO 16610-28: Linear profile filters: End effects (published in 2016)
- ISO 16610-29: Linear profile filters: Spline wavelets (published in 2015)
- ISO 16610-30: Robust profile filters: Basic concepts (published in 2015)
- ISO 16610-31: Robust profile filters: Gaussian regression filters (published in 2016)
- ISO 16610-32: Robust profile filters: Spline filters (published as a TS in 2009)
- ISO 16610-40: Morphological profile filters: Basic concepts (published in 2015)
- ISO 16610-41: Morphological profile filters: Disc and horizontal line-segment filters (published in 2015)
- ISO 16610-45: Morphological profile filters: Segmentation filters (planned for the future)
- ISO 16610-49: Morphological profile filters: Scale space techniques (published in 2015)

Note: ISO/TS 16610-32 on robust spline filters was published as a technical specification in 2009 but was withdrawn in 2015.

=== Areal filters ===
Areal filters are defined for surfaces measured either by lateral scanning instruments or optical profilometers. Parts related to areal filters are:

- ISO 16610-60: Linear areal filter: Basic concepts (published in 2015)
- ISO 16610-61: Linear areal filter: Gaussian filters (published in 2015)
- ISO 16610-62: Linear areal filter: Spline filters
- ISO 16610-68: Linear areal filter: End-effects (planned for the future)
- ISO 16610-69: Linear areal filter: Spline wavelets
- ISO 16610-70: Robust areal filter: Basic concepts
- ISO 16610-71: Robust areal filter: Gaussian regression filters (published in 2014)
- ISO 16610-80: Morphological areal filter: Basic concepts
- ISO 16610-81: Morphological areal filter: Sphere and horizontal planar segment filters
- ISO 16610-85: Morphological areal filter: Segmentation (published in 2013)
- ISO 16610-89: Morphological areal filter: Scale space techniques

== Guide for the use of filters in surface texture ==
The following section describes which application is suitable for each filter. References to published papers or books are provided when available. Readers are encouraged to add below proven applications related to surface texture and tribology where a particular filter can be used alone or in conjunction with other treatments or analyses to provide significant results.

- Part 21 - Profile Gaussian filter
  - Microroughness filtering (lambda S)
  - Separation of roughness and waviness profiles (lambda C)
  - Band-pass filtering
- Part 22 - Profile Spline filter
- Part 29 - Profile Spline wavelets
- Part 31 - Profile Robust Gaussian filter
- Part 41 - Profile Morphological filter
- Part 45 - Profile Segmentation filter
- Part 49 - Profile Scale space technique
- Part 61 - Areal Gaussian filter
  - Microroughness S-Filter
  - L-Filter for the generation of the roughness S-L surface
- Part 62 - Areal Spline filter
- Part 71 - Areal Robust regression Gaussian filter
  - Microroughness S-Filter on stratified and structured surfaces
  - L-Filter for the generation of the roughness S-L surface on stratified and structured surfaces
  - F-Filter for the generation of S-F surface
  - Outlier detection
- Part 81 - Areal Morphological filter
  - F-Filter used to flatten a surface with the upper or lower envelope
  - Tip deconvolution of AFM instrument
- Part 85 - Areal Segmentation filter
  - Identification of structures (grains, pores, cells, ...)
  - Automatic leveling of MEMS
- Part 89 - Areal Scale space technique

== See also ==
- Outline of metrology and measurement
- ISO 25178: areal surface texture standard
- Surface roughness
- Gaussian filter
