= Surface structure =

Surface structure may refer to:

- Surface finish of physical objects
- Surface roughness of physical objects
- Deep structure and surface structure in transformational grammar (in linguistics)
