= Smoothness (disambiguation) =

Smoothness is a term used in mathematical analysis to describe the number of orders of derivative of a function that are continuous.

Smoothness may also refer to:

- Smooth number, in number theory
- Surface metrology
- Surface roughness
- Polishing
