= Digital Surf =

French software company

- Type: Private company
- Industry: Computer software, Research and Development
- Founded: 1989
- Headquarters: Besançon, France
- Key people: Christophe Mignot, (CEO); François Blateyron (COO)
- Products: MountainsMap
- Revenue: €4.3 million (2017)
- Number of employees: 43
- Subsidiaries: Image Metrology A/S
- Website: www.digitalsurf.com

Digital Surf is a French software company formed in 1989 mainly known for its Mountains software, that is offered as embedded or optional OEM surface analysis software by the majority of profilometer and microscope manufacturers.

== History ==
- Digital Surf was established in 1989 in Besançon, France, initially as manufacturer of 3D non-contact laser profilometers.
- In 1990, the company launched its first profile (2D surface texture) analysis software, for the MS-DOS operating system, followed in 1991 by a topography (3D surface texture analysis) software for the Macintosh II platform.
- In 1992, Digital Surf had a first OEM deal with the company Taylor-Hobson. The software has since been offered by Taylor Hobson under the names TalyMap (topography) and TalyProfile (profile analysis).
- In 1997, Digital Surf moved all its software to Windows and launched a new product for Windows 95 under the name Mountains. Other profilometer manufacturers started to promote it, such as Hommel-Etamic (Jenoptik Group) or KLA-Tencor.
- In 2009, Digital Surf stopped manufacturing profilometers to refocus on the sole Mountains analysis software.
- in 2011, Mountains was supplied as the standard or optional OEM surface analysis software by about 30 manufacturers, including Taylor-Hobson, Jenoptik, KLA-Tencor, Keysight, Leica, Mitaka Kohki, Nikon, or Zeiss.
- Digital Surf has contributed to the ISO 25178 standard that defines new 3D surface texture parameters.
- in 2014 Digital Surf took over the Danish company Image Metrology, the developer of the software SPIP, specialized in the image analysis for atomic force microscopes. As a result, the version 8 of Mountains includes SPIP.
- in 2018 Digital Surf claims that its Mountains software is used by 15,000 users and integrated by more than 50 instrument manufacturers worldwide, including Bruker, Hitachi, Thermo Fisher Scientific, JEOL, Anton Paar, Nanosystem, Confovis.

== Products ==
The Mountains software is offered to end users as four main lines of products

- MountainsMap, software for profilometers (2D Profilometers, 3D optical profilers and light microscopes)
- MountainsSEM, software for scanning electron microscopes
- MountainsSPIP, software for scanning probe microscopes (atomic force microscopes, scanning tunneling microscopes). MountainsSPIP 8.0 is the successor and merger of Mountains SPM 7.4 from Digital Surf and SPIP 6.7 from Image Metrology
- MountainsLab groups all functions in a single package dedicated to multi-instrument microscopy core facilities

Optional modules to the previous cover force curve analysis (for atomic force microscopes), hyperspectral analysis, contour analysis and application-dedicated functionality.

Versions supplied through instrument manufacturers under their own brands are products tailored from MountainsMap, MountainsSEM or MountainsSPIP.
