= Focus variation =

Focus variation is a method used to sharpen images and to measure surface irregularities by means of optics with limited depth of field.

== Algorithm ==
The algorithm works as follows:

1. At first images with difference focus are captured. This is done by moving the sample or the optics in relation to each other.
2. Then for each position the focus over each plane is calculated
3. The plane with the best focus is used to get a sharp image. the corresponding depth gives the depth at this position-

== Optics ==
Focus variation requires an optics with very little depth of field. This can be realized if a microscopy like optics and a microscope objective is used. These objectives have a high numerical aperture which gives a small depth of field.

== Usage ==
The use of this method is for optical surface metrology and coordinate-measuring machine. This means measuring form, waviness and roughness on samples. With optimized hardware and software components a lateral resolution of 500 nm (limitation of wavelength of light) and a vertical resolution of several nm can be reached.

== Advantages and disadvantages ==
Advantages:

- Can be used on samples with steep flanks. This is because a ring light can be used to extend the illumination aperture
- Very vibration insensitive
- Can deliver color information
- Can measure on rough and smooth surfaces

Disadvantages:

- Normal focus variation can not be used if the surface of the sample does not give structure in the image. This means it can not be used for wafers and glass. Focus variation according to ISO 25178-606 can also measure smooth surfaces.

== Standardisation ==
The ISO committee is working on a new series of ISO standards, called the ISO 25178 series. The 6-part document describes the available methods for roughness measurement. Focus variation is one of the described methods.

== See also ==
- Roughness
- Surface metrology
