= Surface metrology =

Measurement of small-scale features on surfaces

Surface metrology is the measurement and characterization of surface topography, and is a branch of metrology. Surface primary form, surface fractality, and surface finish (including surface roughness) are the parameters most commonly associated with the field. Surface metrology is a fundamental measurement science critical across diverse manufacturing and engineering disciplines. While historically associated with precision machining and mechanical assemblies, it now plays essential roles in industries ranging from medical devices and electronics to aerospace and energy systems. Applications include ensuring biocompatibility of implants, optimizing semiconductor wafer quality, controlling paint adhesion in automotive manufacturing, enhancing solar panel efficiency, and managing thermal performance in electronic components. The field encompasses measurements from nanometer-scale surface features to large industrial components, making it indispensable for quality control, performance optimization, and failure prevention across modern manufacturing.

Surface finish may be measured in two ways: contact and non-contact methods. Contact methods involve dragging a measurement stylus across the surface; these instruments are called profilometers. Non-contact methods include: interferometry, digital holography, confocal microscopy, focus variation, structured light, electrical capacitance, electron microscopy, photogrammetry and non-contact profilometers.

== Overview ==
The earliest ways of surface measurement relied on subjective tactile and visual inspection via fingernail and eye respectively. The quantitative way of measuring surfaces were based on this rough concept. This created two main branches of instrumentation that follow the contact and optical form coming from these rudimentary techniques. Contact techniques use physical probes to map the surface topography and optical methods employ light based systems to characterize surface features and geometry.

The most common method is to use a diamond stylus profilometer. The stylus is run perpendicular to the lay of the surface. The probe usually traces along a straight line on a flat surface or in a circular arc around a cylindrical surface. The length of the path that it traces is called the measurement length. The wavelength of the lowest frequency filter that will be used to analyze the data is usually defined as the sampling length. Most standards recommend that the measurement length should be at least seven times longer than the sampling length, and according to the Nyquist–Shannon sampling theorem it should be at least two times longer than the wavelength of interesting features. The assessment length or evaluation length is the length of data that will be used for analysis. Commonly one sampling length is discarded from each end of the measurement length. 3D measurements can be made with a profilometer by scanning over a 2D area on the surface.

The disadvantage of a profilometer is that it is not accurate when the size of the features of the surface are close to the same size as the stylus. Another disadvantage is that profilometers have difficulty detecting flaws of the same general size as the roughness of the surface. There are also limitations for non-contact instruments. For example, instruments that rely on optical interference cannot resolve features that are less than some fraction of the operating wavelength. Another limitation is that it cannot take reliable measurements of edge cross-sections. This limitation can make it difficult to accurately measure roughness even on common objects, since the interesting features may be well below the wavelength of light. The wavelength of red light is about 650 nm, while the average roughness, (R_{a}) of a ground shaft might be 200 nm.

The first step of analysis is to filter the raw data to remove very high frequency data (called "micro-roughness") since it can often be attributed to vibrations or debris on the surface. Filtering out the micro-roughness at a given cut-off threshold also allows to bring closer the roughness assessment made using profilometers having different stylus ball radius e.g. 2 μm and 5 μm radii. Next, the data is separated into roughness, waviness and form. This can be accomplished using reference lines, envelope methods, digital filters, fractals or other techniques. Finally, the data is summarized using one or more roughness parameters, or a graph. In the past, surface finish was usually analyzed by hand. The roughness trace would be plotted on graph paper, and an experienced machinist decided what data to ignore and where to place the mean line. Today, the measured data is stored on a computer, and analyzed using methods from signal analysis and statistics.

The effect of different form removal techniques on surface finish analysis

Plots showing how filter cutoff frequency affects the separation between waviness and roughness

Illustration showing how the raw profile from a surface finish trace is decomposed into a primary profile, form, waviness and roughness

Illustration showing the effect of using different filters to separate a surface finish trace into waviness and roughness

== Equipment ==
=== Contact (tactile measurement) ===
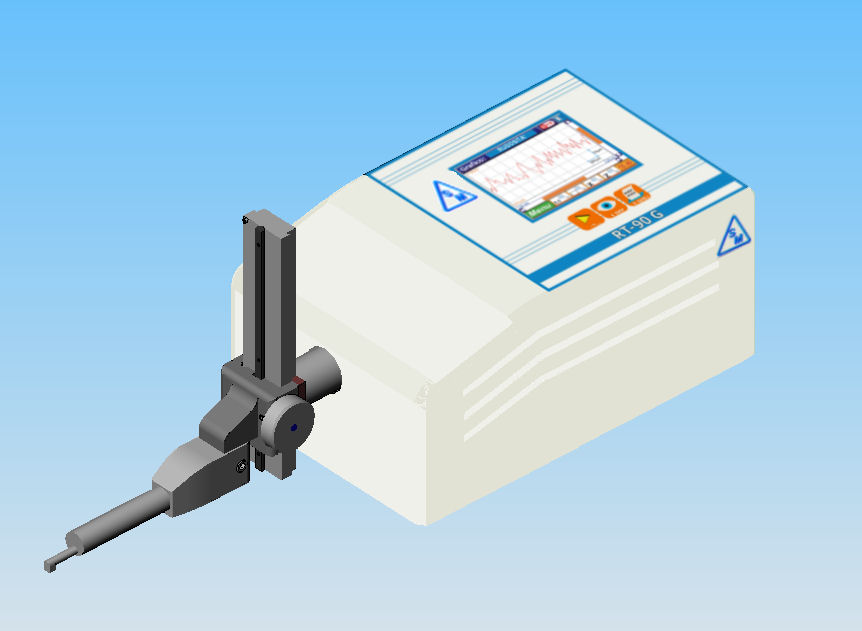

Stylus-based contact instruments have the following advantages:

- The system is very simple and sufficient for basic roughness, waviness or form measurement requiring only 2D profiles (e.g. calculation of the Ra value).
- The system is never lured by the optical properties of a sample (e.g. highly reflective, transparent, micro-structured).
- The stylus ignores the oil film covering many metal components during their industrial process.

Technologies:

- Contact Profilometers – traditionally use a diamond stylus and work like a phonograph.
- Atomic force microscope are sometimes also considered contact profilers operating at atomic scale.

=== Non-contact (optical microscopes) ===
Optical measurement instruments have some advantages over the tactile ones as follows:

- no touching of the surface (the sample can not be damaged)
- the measurement speed is usually much higher (up to a million 3D points can be measured in a second)
- some of them are genuinely built for 3D surface topography rather than single traces of data
- they can measure surfaces through transparent medium such as glass or plastic film
- non-contact measurement may sometimes be the only solution when the component to measure is very soft (e.g. pollution deposit) or very hard (e.g. abrasive paper).

Vertical scanning:

- Coherence scanning interferometry
- Confocal microscopy
- Focus variation
- Confocal chromatic aberration

Horizontal scanning:

- Scanning laser microscope (SLM)
- Structured-light scanning

Non-scanning

- Digital holographic microscopy

=== Choice of the right measurement instrument ===
Because every instrument has advantages and disadvantages the operator must choose the right instrument depending on the measurement application. In the following some advantages and disadvantages to the main technologies are listed:

- Interferometry: This method has the highest vertical resolution of any optical technique and lateral resolution equivalent to most other optical techniques except for confocal which has better lateral resolution. Instruments can measure very smooth surfaces using phase-shifting interferometry (PSI) with high vertical repeatability; such systems can be dedicated for measuring large parts (up to 300mm) or microscope-based. They can also use coherence scanning interferometry (CSI) with a white-light source to measure steep or rough surfaces, including machined metal, foam, paper and more. As is the case with all optical techniques, the interaction of light with the sample for this instruments is not fully understood. This means that measurement errors can occur especially for roughness measurement.
- Digital Holography: this method provides 3D topography with a similar resolution as interferometry. Moreover, as it is a non-scanning technique, it ideal for the measurement of moving samples, deformable surfaces, MEMS dynamics, chemical reactions, the effect of magnetic or electrical field on samples, and measurement of the presence of vibrations, in particular for quality control.:
- Focus variation: This method delivers color information, can measure on steep flanks and can measure on very rough surfaces. The disadvantage is that this method can not measure on surfaces with a very smooth surface roughness like a silicon wafer. The main application is metal (machined parts and tools), plastic or paper samples.
- Confocal microscopy: this method has the advantage of high lateral resolution because of the use of a pin hole but has the disadvantage that it can not measure on steep flanks. Also, it quickly loses vertical resolution when looking at large areas since the vertical sensitivity depends on the microscope objective in use.
- Confocal chromatic aberration: This method has the advantage of measuring certain height ranges without a vertical scan, can measure very rough surfaces with ease, and smooth surfaces down to the single nm range. The fact that these sensors have no moving parts allows for very high scan speeds and makes them very repeatable. Configurations with a high numerical aperture can measure on relatively steep flanks. Multiple sensors, with the same or different measurement ranges, can be used simultaneously, allowing differential measurement approaches (TTV) or expanding the use case of a system.
- Contact profilometer: this method is the most common surface measurement technique. The advantages are that it is a cheap instrument and has higher lateral resolution than optical techniques, depending on the stylus tip radius chosen. New systems can do 3D measurements in addition to 2D traces and can measure form and critical dimensions as well as roughness. However, the disadvantages are that the stylus tip has to be in physical contact with the surface, which may alter the surface and/or stylus and cause contamination. Furthermore, due to the mechanical interaction, the scan speeds are significantly slower than with optical methods. Because of the stylus shank angle, stylus profilometers cannot measure up to the edge of a rising structure, causing a "shadow"or undefined area, usually much larger than what is typical for optical systems.

=== Resolution ===
The scale of the desired measurement will help decide which type of microscope will be used. During measurement there are multiple factors to take into consideration:

- Vertical resolution: smallest detectable change in surface height measurements, this will be a limiting factor in measuring height deviations
- Lateral resolution: minimum separable distance between surface features in the x-y planes, and dependent on the interaction between the measurement device and surface features
- Sampling length: defined as the nominal wavelength used to separate roughness from waviness components
- Evaluation length: portion of the measured profile used for parameter calculation
- Uncertainty: instrument noise and external environmental factors that can add error to measurement

These limitations determine at what scale the surface can be interpreted up to and how accurate it can be. It can also determine what type of microscope will need to be used. As a broad example, a wide-angle lens isn't used to photograph tiny details on a coin. In surface metrology this would be the equivalent of using an interferometric microscope which uses light to measure depth rather than a focus variation microscope which uses focusing mechanics. However a focus variation microscope might be better at capturing different geometry like edge cross sections, while a light based microscope would not be able due to how it reflects off angles.

These limitations also lend itself into scales of interaction. Since these measurements are at the scale of nanometers it is unlikely that there will be repeatability or reproducibility. Different microscopes will produce different results since uncertainty is higher, however this doesn't mean that correlations are impossible.

In practice for 3D measurements, the probe is commanded to scan over a 2D area on the surface. The spacing between data points may not be the same in both directions. In some cases, the physics of the measuring instrument may have a large effect on the data. This is especially true when measuring very smooth surfaces. For contact measurements, the most obvious problem is that the stylus may scratch the measured surface. Vice versa, the stylus may be too blunt to reach the bottom of deep valleys and it may round the tips of sharp peaks. In this case the probe is a physical filter that limits the accuracy of the instrument.

== Multiscale Analysis ==
Measuring a surface can have very broad implications as it depends on the sampling size. Measurements depending on the device can be in millimeters, micrometers, or even nanometers. Multiscale analysis is a methodology that involves studying surface topographies at multiple scales of observation and calculation. This approach spawned from the fundamental principle that physical interactions between the manufacturing process and formed surfaces can occur at multiple scales during fabrication. It also highlights the fact that certain topographical features of a particular size are best discernible when observed and analyzed at particular scales. With a specific resolution and filtering techniques the surface can be more easily seen. It is because these components are superimposed onto one another that deriving conclusions in a multiscale method is relevant.

Multiscale analysis facilitates the understanding of relations between processing or performance and topographies across all scales. In other words, both large and small surface features simultaneously effect how the surface interacts with another medium.

== Roughness parameters ==
The real surface geometry is so complicated that a finite number of parameters cannot provide a full description. If the number of parameters used is increased, a more accurate description can be obtained. This is one of the reasons for introducing new parameters for surface evaluation. Surface roughness parameters are normally categorised into three groups according to its functionality. These groups are defined as amplitude parameters, spacing parameters, and hybrid parameters.

=== Profile roughness parameters ===
Parameters used to describe surfaces are largely statistical indicators obtained from many samples of the surface height. Some examples include:

Table of useful surface metrics
Parameter	Name	Description	Type	Formula
R_{a}, R_{aa}, R_{yni}	arithmetic average of absolute values	Mean of the absolute values of the profile heights measured from a mean line averaged over the profile	Amplitude	$R_a = \frac{1}{n} \sum_{i=1}^{n} \left | y_i \right |$
R_{q}, R_{RMS}	root mean squared		Amplitude	$R_q = \sqrt{ \frac{1}{n} \sum_{i=1}^{n} y_i^2 }$
R_{v}	maximum valley depth	Maximum depth of the profile below the mean line with the sampling length	Amplitude	$R_v = \min_{i} y_i$
R_{p}	maximum peak height	Maximum height of the profile above the mean line within the sampling length	Amplitude	$R_p = \max_{i} y_i$
R_{t}	Maximum Height of the Profile	Maximum peak to valley height of the profile in the assessment length	Amplitude	$R_t = R_p - R_v$
R_{sk}	Skewness	Symmetry of the profile about the mean line	Amplitude	$R_{sk} = \frac{1}{n R_q^3} \sum_{i=1}^{n} y_i^3$
R_{ku}	Kurtosis	Measure of the sharpness of the surface profile	Hybrid	$R_{ku} = \frac{1}{n R_q^4} \sum_{i=1}^{n} y_i^4$
RS_{m}	Mean Peak Spacing	Mean Spacing between peaks at the mean line	Spatial	$RS_{m} = \frac{1}{n} \sum_{i=1}^{n} S_i$

This is a small subset of available parameters described in standards like ASME B46.1 and ISO 4287. Most of these parameters originated from the capabilities of profilometers and other mechanical probe systems. In addition, new measures of surface dimensions have been developed which are more directly related to the measurements made possible by high-definition optical gauging technologies. These parameters are calculated after filtering has taken place.

Most of these parameters can be estimated using the SurfCharJ plugin for the ImageJ.

=== Areal surface parameters ===
The surface roughness can also be calculated over an area. This gives S_{a} instead of R_{a} values. The basis behind these different measurement parameters is the difference between Euclidean and Fractal geometry. When examining surfaces at large scales (visible without much magnification), the surface profiles are described using parameters based on smooth, continuous, and differentiable functions. An analogy commonly used is the act of measuring a coastline. From afar in space the coastline might appear smooth but zooming in they become much more irregular and at a certain point infinite. Engineered and natural surfaces exhibit complexity across multiple scales similar to this coastline analogy. This is what makes traditional Euclidean measurement scale dependent and insufficient for a full surface characterization. This has led to the use of characterization surface profiles with fractal parameters which was first pioneered by Benoît Mandelbrot. The ISO 25178 series describes all these roughness values in detail. The advantage over the profile parameters are:

- more significant values in terms of characterizing a surface topography rather than just height data points
- more relation to a function which can then be compared or correlated to processes or properties of a surface

With these fractal properties a multi-scale measurement can be made such as Length-scale Fractal Analysis or Area-scale Fractal Analysis. Since fractal surfaces exhibit self-similarity across theoretically infinite scales, multiscale analysis must define practical resolution boundaries.

== Filtering ==
Surface texture evaluation can only be done once measurement data has been pruned of any possible external errors that have occurred during measurement. Mathematically, data points are separated into overlapping shape, waviness, and roughness that the surface measurement device records through a process called filtering.

Filtering helps distinguish between long-wavelength shape and short wavelength asperities. For example the overall shape of the part, the waviness created from machining, and any external artifacts like a piece of dust that is on the component gets recorded by the surface measurement device. All of these components are superimposed onto one another making it hard to distinguish and characterize the surface. Filtering separates these superimposed components for proper analysis. Primary form is the intended overall geometric shape and at the largest relevant scale of resolution that can be garnered from the object. Waviness usually depicts the medium wavelength deviations that influence contact mechanics and fluid flow. Lastly, the short wavelength irregularities usually refer to surface roughness which can determine tribological aspects and appearance. These surface deviation components must be measurable separately so that suppliers and customers have a clear understanding of the expected surface characteristics.

In addition to this there are also external factors that can influence measurement systems. Electronic interference, vibrations, thermal drift, and artifacts (like dust if using a contact microscope) are described as noise that have no physical meaning and must be filtered out to reveal the actual surface characteristics.

Typically, either digital or analog filters are used to separate form error, waviness, and roughness resulting from a measurement. Main multi-scale filtering methods are Gaussian filtering, Wavelet transform and more recently Discrete Modal Decomposition. There are three characteristics of these filters that should be known in order to understand the parameter values that an instrument may calculate. These are the spatial wavelength at which a filter separates roughness from waviness or waviness from form error, the sharpness of a filter or how cleanly the filter separates two components of the surface deviations and the distortion of a filter or how much the filter alters a spatial wavelength component in the separation process. Developing and testing new filters are an intrinsic part to being able to characterize and apply the data taken from surfaces.

== Applications ==
Surface metrology helps with understanding creations or modifications on surfaces. This has led to discoveries in forensics, anthropology, paleontology, and archaeology.

- In tribological applications, negatively skewed surfaces (Ssk parameter) exhibit superior lubricant retention properties, with textured surfaces containing dimples reducing frictional resistance in mixed boundary and fluid lubrication conditions
- Statistical analysis conclusions are drawn with high correlations, between positive curvature topography and fatigue limit of machined steel.
- Surface metrology research has identified optimal roughness ranges for orthopedic implant performance. Studies on Ti13Nb13Zr implants demonstrate that surface roughness in the range of 20-25 μm optimizes cell attachment, mechanical properties, and wettability simultaneously.

== See also ==
- Flatness (manufacturing) – Geometric condition for workpieces and tools
- Profilometer – Measuring instrument for surface profile and roughness
- Surface engineering – Altering the properties of solid surfaces
- Surface finish – Small, local deviations of a surface from a perfectly flat ideal
- Surface finishing – Range of processes that alter the surface of an item to achieve a certain property
- Surface science – Study of physical and chemical phenomena that occur at the interface of two phases
- Range imaging – Measuring technique
