= Gorton (typeface) =

Typeface developed for engraving machines

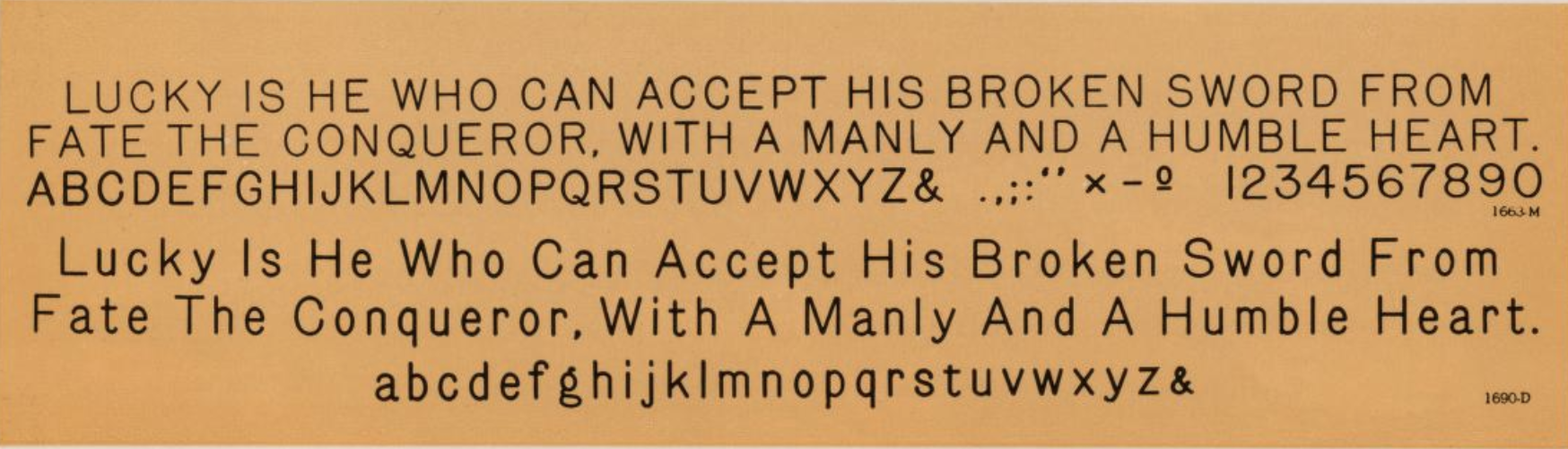
Sample of the typeface Gorton Normal from the George Gorton Machine Co. catalogue

Gorton is a monoline typeface designed by the British company Taylor, Taylor, & Hobson as a routing font for engraved legends on their products. They licensed it for use by the George Gorton Machine Co. of Racine, Wisconsin in 1895, who used it for their templates for their engraving machines under the name 'Gorton'.

It became ubiquitous through its use on engraved signs, and electronic equipment, including computer keyboards and aviation equipment.

The Gorton font family was specified in the U.S. military standard MIL-M-18012B for use in aviation equipment. It was also recommended for aviation and workstation uses at NASA.

== See also ==
- Hershey fonts, vector fonts designed to be rendered using vectors on early cathode ray tube displays
- Vector font
