= Abbott-Firestone curve =

The Abbott-Firestone curve.

The Abbott-Firestone curve or bearing area curve (BAC) describes the surface texture of an object. The curve can be found from a profile trace by drawing lines parallel to the datum and measuring the fraction of the line which lies within the profile.

Mathematically it is the cumulative probability density function of the surface profile's height and can be calculated by integrating the probability density function.

The Abbott-Firestone curve was first described by Ernest James Abbott and Floyd Firestone in 1933. It is useful for understanding the properties of sealing and bearing surfaces. It is commonly used in the engineering and manufacturing of piston cylinder bores of internal combustion engines. The shape of the curve is distilled into several of the surface roughness parameters, especially the Rk family of parameters.
