= Surface engineering =

Altering the properties of solid surfaces

Surface engineering is the sub-discipline of materials science which deals with the surface of solid matter. It has applications to chemistry, mechanical engineering, and electrical engineering (particularly in relation to semiconductor manufacturing).

Solids are composed of a bulk material covered by a surface. The surface which bounds the bulk material is called the surface phase. It acts as an interface to the surrounding environment. The bulk material in a solid is called the bulk phase.

The surface phase of a solid interacts with the surrounding environment. This interaction can degrade the surface phase over time. Environmental degradation of the surface phase over time can be caused by wear, corrosion, fatigue and creep.

Surface engineering involves altering the properties of the surface phase in order to reduce the degradation over time. This is accomplished by making the surface robust to the environment in which it will be used. It provides a cost-effective material for robust design. A spectrum of topics that represent the diverse nature of the field of surface engineering includes plating technologies, nano and emerging technologies and surface engineering, characterization and testing.

== Applications ==
Surface engineering techniques are being used in the automotive, aerospace, missile, power, electronic, biomedical, textile, petroleum, petrochemical, chemical, steel, cement, machine tools and construction industries including road surfacing. Surface engineering techniques can be used to develop a wide range of functional properties, including physical, chemical, electrical, electronic, magnetic, mechanical, wear-resistant and corrosion-resistant properties at the required substrate surfaces. Almost all types of materials, including metals, ceramics, polymers, and composites can be coated on similar or dissimilar materials. It is also possible to form coatings of newer materials (e.g., met glass. beta-C_{3}N_{4}), graded deposits, multi-component deposits etc. The advanced materials and deposition processes including recent developments in ultra hard materials like BAM (AlMgB compound)are fully covered in a recent book[R. Chattopadhyay:Green Tribology, Green Surface Engineering and Global Warming, ASM International, USA,2014]

In 1995, surface engineering was a £10 billion market in the United Kingdom. Coatings, to make surface life robust from wear and corrosion, was approximately half the market.

In recent years, there has been a paradigm shift in surface engineering from age-old electroplating to processes such as vapor phase deposition, diffusion, thermal spray & welding using heat sources, such as, laser, plasma, solar beam.microwave;friction.pulsed combustion. ion, electron pulsed arc, spark, friction and induction.[Ref:R.Chattopadhyay:Advanced Thermally Assisted Surface Engineering Processes, Springer, New York, USA, 2004]

It is estimated that loss due to wear and corrosion in the US is approximately $500 billion. In the US, there are around 9524 establishments (including automotive, aircraft, power and construction industries) who depend on engineered surfaces with support from 23,466 industries.

There are around 65 academic institutions world-wide engaged in surface engineering research and education.

== Surface cleaning techniques ==
Surface cleaning, synonymously referred to as dry cleaning, is a mechanical cleaning technique used to reduce superficial soil, dust, grime, insect droppings, accretions, or other surface deposits. (Dry cleaning, as the term is used in paper conservation, does not employ the use of organic solvents.) Surface cleaning may be used as an independent cleaning technique, as one step (usually the first) in a more comprehensive treatment, or as a prelude to further treatments (e.g., aqueous immersion) which may cause dirt to set irreversibly in paper fibers.

== Purpose ==
The purpose of surface cleaning is to reduce the potential for damage to paper artifacts by removing foreign material which can be abrasive, acidic, hygroscopic, or degradative. The decision to remove surface dirt is also for aesthetic reasons when it interferes with the visibility of the imagery or information. A decision must be made balancing the probable care of each object against the possible problems related to surface cleaning.

== Environmental benefits ==
The application of surface engineering to components leads to improved lifetime (e.g., by corrosion resistance) and improved efficiency (e.g., by reducing friction) which directly reduces the emissions corresponding to those components. Applying innovative surface engineering technologies to the energy sector has the potential of reducing annual CO_{2}-eq emissions by up to 1.8 Gt in 2050 and 3.4 Gt in 2100. This corresponds to 7% and 8.5% annual reduction in the energy sector in 2050 and 2100, respectively. Despite those benefits, a major environmental drawback is the dissipative losses occurring throughout the life cycle of the components, and the associated environmental impacts of them. In thermal spray surface engineering applications, the majority of those dissipative losses occur at the coating stage (up to 39%), where part of the sprayed powders do not adhere to the substrate.

== See also ==
- Energetically modified cement – Class of cements, mechanically processed to transform reactivity
- Surface finishing – Range of processes that alter the surface of an item to achieve a certain property
- Surface science – Study of physical and chemical phenomena that occur at the interface of two phases
- Surface metrology – Measurement of small-scale features on surfaces
- Tribology – Science of rubbing surfaces
