= Hershey fonts =

Typeface family

This text is drawn using Roman Complex (top) and Roman Simplex (bottom) fonts of the collection

A type specimen showing all Roman and Blackletter fonts in the collection

All occidental Hershey glyphs

All oriental Hershey glyphs

The Hershey fonts are a collection of vector fonts developed c. 1967 by Dr. Allen Vincent Hershey at the Naval Weapons Laboratory, originally designed to be rendered using vectors on early cathode ray tube displays. Decomposing curves to connected straight lines allowed Hershey to produce complex typographic designs. In their original form the font data consists simply of a series of coordinates, meant to be connected by straight lines on the screen. The fonts are publicly available and have few usage restrictions. Vector fonts are easily scaled and rotated in two or three dimensions; consequently the Hershey fonts have been widely used in computer graphics, computer-aided design programs, and more recently also in computer-aided manufacturing applications like laser engraving.

== Styles ==
Some glyphs were developed in four different versions, dubbed Simplex, Duplex, Complex and Triplex, which used different numbers of strokes to compose their contours.

== Coverage ==
The fonts include Latin, Greek, Cyrillic, Japanese (kanji, hiragana and katakana). Symbolic glyphs support mathematics, musical notation, map markers, as well as meteorological symbols. The fonts also exist in Scalable Vector Graphics (SVG) format to support HTML 5. Over 2,000 original plottings are defined. The font data for 1,377 (Occidental) characters was published by NIST in 1976.

== Influence ==
The Hershey fonts were a major influence on the design of Minotaur, a typeface produced by the Parisian type foundry Production Type in 2014. In 2015, German graphic designer Frank Grießhammer announced that he created an outline version that can be used in contemporary applications and it is released under an open source license.

== See also ==
- Ghostscript
- IGES
- Gorton (typeface)
- Calligraphy for Computers : work by Dr. A. V. Hershey on Wikisource.
