= Budi Sulistiyo =

Indonesian bureaucrat (born 1966)

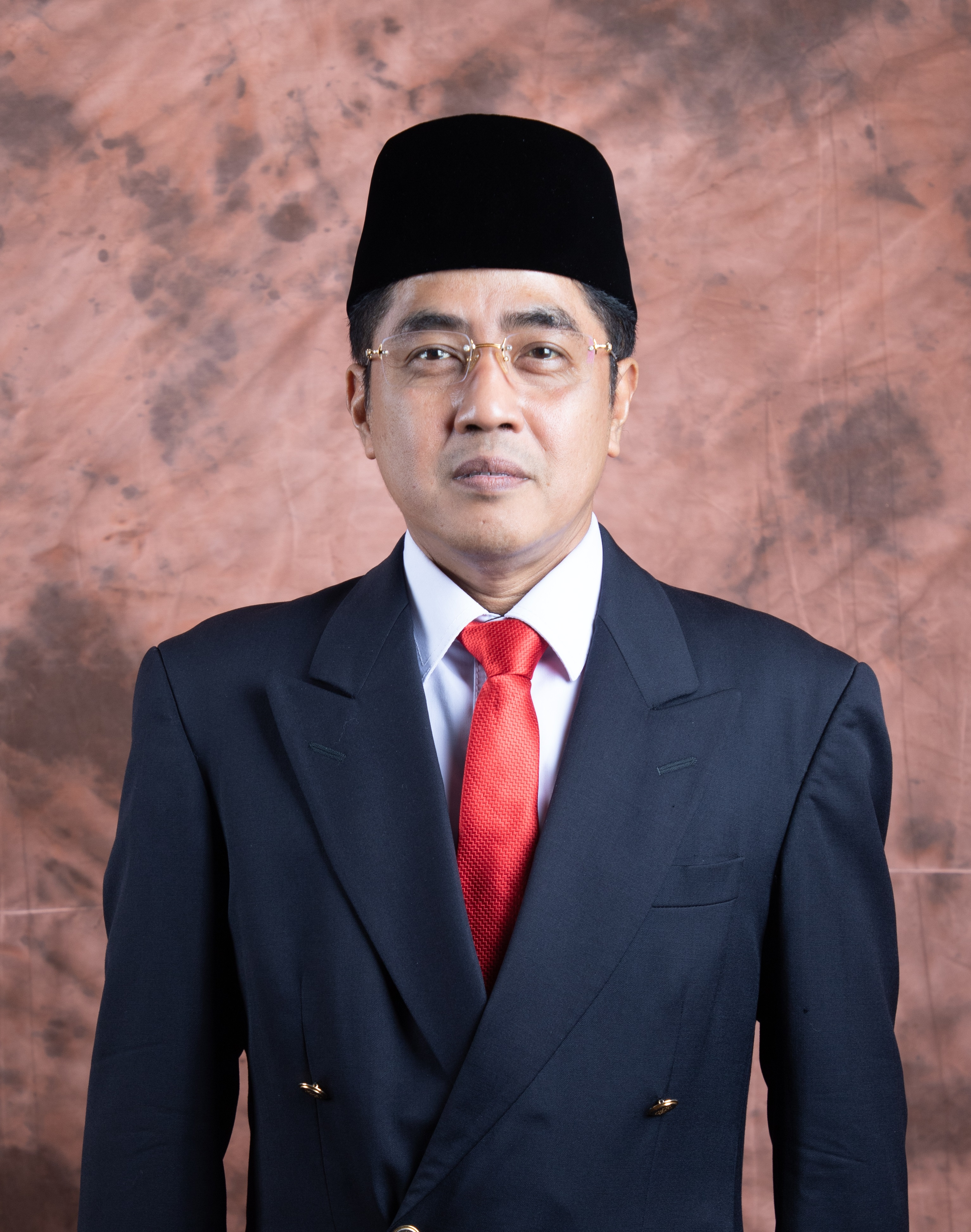

Director General for Marine and Fisheries Product Competitiveness Development
- In office 13 April 2023 – 19 March 2025
- Preceded by: Agus Suherman; Ishartini (acting)
- Succeeded by: Tornanda Syaifullah

Personal details
- Born: 30 November 1966 (age 59) Surakarta, Central Java, Indonesia
- Education: University of Innsbruck

Budi Sulistiyo (born 30 November 1966) is an Indonesian bureaucrat who is serving as the director general for marine and fisheries product competitiveness development in the Ministry of Marine and Fisheries since 13 April 2023.

== Early life and education ==
Born in Surakarta on 30 November 1966, Budi completed his high school at the 3th State High School in Surakarta in 1986. He received a scholarship from Minister of Research of Technology B. J. Habibie to study geography at the University of Innsbruck and received his bachelor's degree from the university in 1989. Budi continued his postgraduate studies in the same university, where he received a master's degree in geomorphology in 1992 and a doctoral in geomorphometry in 1995.

== Career ==
Budi began his career as a civil servant at the National Coordinating Agency for Surveys and Mapping. He was appointed as the head of marketing and promotion of the agency from 1997 to 1999. In 1999, President Abdurrahman Wahid formed the Department of Marine Exploration, and Budi was transferred to the department. He headed several sections in the department (which was later renamed to the Department of Marine and Fisheries). He headed the Center for Research on Marine Areas and Non-living Resources from 2008 to 2010 and the Center for Marine and Coastal Resources Research and Development from 2010 to 2015.

On 15 December 2015, Budi was appointed as the chief of data, statistics, and information center in the ministry's secretariat general. In 2017, the data center of the Ministry of Marine and Fisheries and the Ministry of Education was selected by the presidential chief of staff office to develop an integrated data system. The project resulted in the standardization of marine and fisheries business' data and the creation of Kusuka, an identity card for marine and fisheries businesses integrated with the civil registry. Budi was nominated as the deputy for cultural coordination in the Coordinating Ministry for Human Development and Cultural Affairs in the same year, but failed to pass the selection process.

He was further promoted to become the expert staff to the minister for societal and inter-institutional relations on 21 June 2021. On 14 April 2023, Budi became the director general for marine and fisheries product competitiveness development. At his inauguration, Minister Sakti Wahyu Trenggono instructed Budi to ensure the quality of raw materials for marine and fisheries product.

As director general, Budi initiated events to increase fish consumption, mostly notably by declaring 2024 as the Year of Tuna. The directorate general constructed an integrated database to monitor and accelerate development in the marine and fisheries sector. He was replaced by Tornanda Syaifullah, who previously served as the ministry's inspector general, on 19 March 2025.
