= Normal contact stiffness =

Physical quantity of rough surfaces

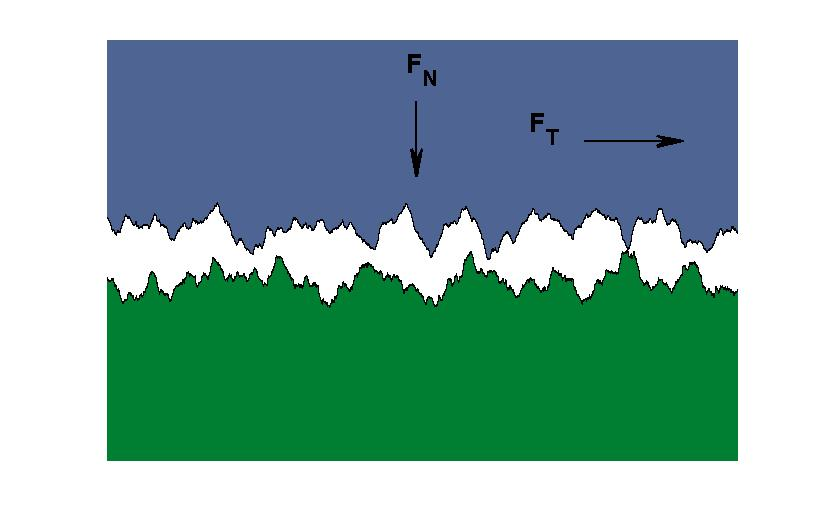
Contacting surfaces with applied normal and tangential forces

Normal contact stiffness is a physical quantity related to the generalized force displacement behavior of rough surfaces in contact with a rigid body or a second similar rough surface. Specifically it is the amount of force per unit displacement required to compress an elastic object in the contact region. Rough surfaces can be considered as consisting of large numbers of asperities. As two solid bodies of the same material approach one another, the asperities interact, and they transition from conditions of non-contact to homogeneous bulk behaviour, with changes in the contact area. The varying values of stiffness and true contact area at an interface during this transition are dependent on the conditions of applied pressure and are of importance for the study of systems involving the physical interactions of multiple bodies including granular matter, electrode contacts, and thermal contacts, where the interface-localized structures govern overall system performance by controlling the transmission of force, heat, charge carriers or matter through the interface.

See Diffusion bonding for the industrial application of normal contact stiffness.
