= Gwyddion (software) =

- Original authors: David Nečas (Yeti), Petr Klapetek
- Developer: Czech Metrology Institute
- Release: 2 March 2004 (preview version 0.99.1).
- Stable release: 2.71 / 14 April 2026; 2 months ago
- Preview release: 3.11 / 25 June 2026; 15 days ago
- Written in: C
- Operating system: Cross-platform
- Available in: English
- Type: SPM Data Analysis Program
- License: GPL (Free software)
- Website: gwyddion.net
- Repository: sourceforge.net/projects/gwyddion/

Gwyddion is a multiplatform modular free software for visualization and analysis of data from scanning probe microscopy (SPM) techniques (like AFM, MFM, STM, SNOM/NSOM). The project is led by its main developers David Nečas (Yeti) and Petr Klapetek who work together with various developers across the world. The software is made available as free software under the terms of the GNU General Public License. The name “Gwyddion” is that of a prominent god in Welsh Mythology (see Gwydion).

It is created for the analysis of height fields and other 2D (image) data. While it is primarily intended for data originating from scanning probe microscopy techniques (like AFM, MFM, STM, SNOM/NSOM), it may also be used for the analysis of profilometry data, for instance. Data is calculated and stored in the native file format (.gwy) in double precision.

Gwyddion supports many different file types and performs many image-based functions. Among others it can open and save the following graphics file formats:

- Windows bitmap (.bmp)
- Joint Photographic Experts Group (.jpeg, .jpg, or .jpe)
- Portable Network Graphics (.png)
- TARGA (.tga)
- Tagged image file format (.tiff, .tif)
- Portable aNy Map (.pnm)

== Technical features ==
Quote from homepage of Gwyddion: 'Gwyddion uses a fairly general physical unit system, there are no principal limitations on the types of physical quantities data (and lateral dimensions) can represent. Units of slopes, areas, volumes, and other derived quantities are correctly calculated. SI unit system is used whenever possible.

Tools and other dialogs remember their parameters, not only between tool invocations during one session, but also between sessions. Gwyddion native file format (.gwy) supports saving all data specific settings: false color palette, masks, presentations, selections, associated 3D view parameters, graphs associated with that data and their settings, etc.'

Gwyddion is mainly developed on Linux platform using GNU set of compilers and utilities. Its graphical user interface is based on the popular interface toolkit GTK+.

== Availability and versions ==
It is available for Linux platforms and has been ported to other unix flavors that has support the GNU Autotools or its equivalent. The Windows version is slightly incomplete due to limitations of the platform, but supports nearly all major features. The Mac OS version can be built using Xcode, and some pre-built binaries are available.

Apple Darwin, or OpenDarwin is the only major platform Gwyddion has not been thoroughly tested on. Gwyddion program could also be ported to other branches of the BSD operating system.

== See also ==
- Atomic force microscopy
- ImageJ
- MountainsMap
- Scanning probe microscopy
