= William Taylor (inventor) =

British inventor, born 1866

William Taylor (11 June 1865 – February 28, 1937) was a British inventor who invented items for improvement of photographic lenses. With his brother Thomas Smithies Taylor, he founded the lens-making company Taylor, Taylor and Hobson.

Taylor was a president of the Institution of Mechanical Engineers, and a Fellow of the Royal Society.
