= Soil-surface roughness =

Soil chacteristic

Soil-surface roughness (SSR) are vertical variations present in the micro- and macro-relief of a soil surface, as well as their statistical distribution.

There are four distinct classes of SSR, each one of them representing a characteristic vertical length scale; the first class includes microrelief variations from individual soil grains to aggregates on the order of 0.053–2.0 mm; the second class consists of variations due to soil clods ranging between 2 and 100 mm; the third class of soil surface roughness is systematic elevation differences due to tillage, referred to as oriented roughness (OR), ranging between 100 and 300 mm; the fourth class includes planar curvature, or macro-scale topographic features.

The two first classes account for the so-called microroughness, which has been shown to be largely influenced on an event and seasonal timescale by rainfall and tillage, respectively. Microroughness is most commonly quantified by means of the Random Roughness, which is essentially the standard deviation of bed surface elevation data around the mean elevation, after correction for slope using the best-fit plane and removal of tillage effects in the individual height readings. Rainfall impact can lead to either a decay or increase in microroughnesss, depending upon initial microroughness conditions and soil properties.

On rough soil surfaces, the action of rainsplash detachment tends to smoothen the edges of soil surface roughness, leading to an overall decrease in RR. However, a recent study which examined the response of smooth soil surfaces on rainfall showed that RR can considerably increase for low initial microroughness length scales in the order of 0 – 5 mm. It was also shown that the increase or decrease is consistent among various SSR indices.

== See also ==
- Digital elevation models
- Geomorphology
- Geomorphometry
- Geostatistics
- Remote sensing
- Spatial variability
- Surface texture
- Topography
