= Profilometer =

Measuring instrument for surface profile and roughness

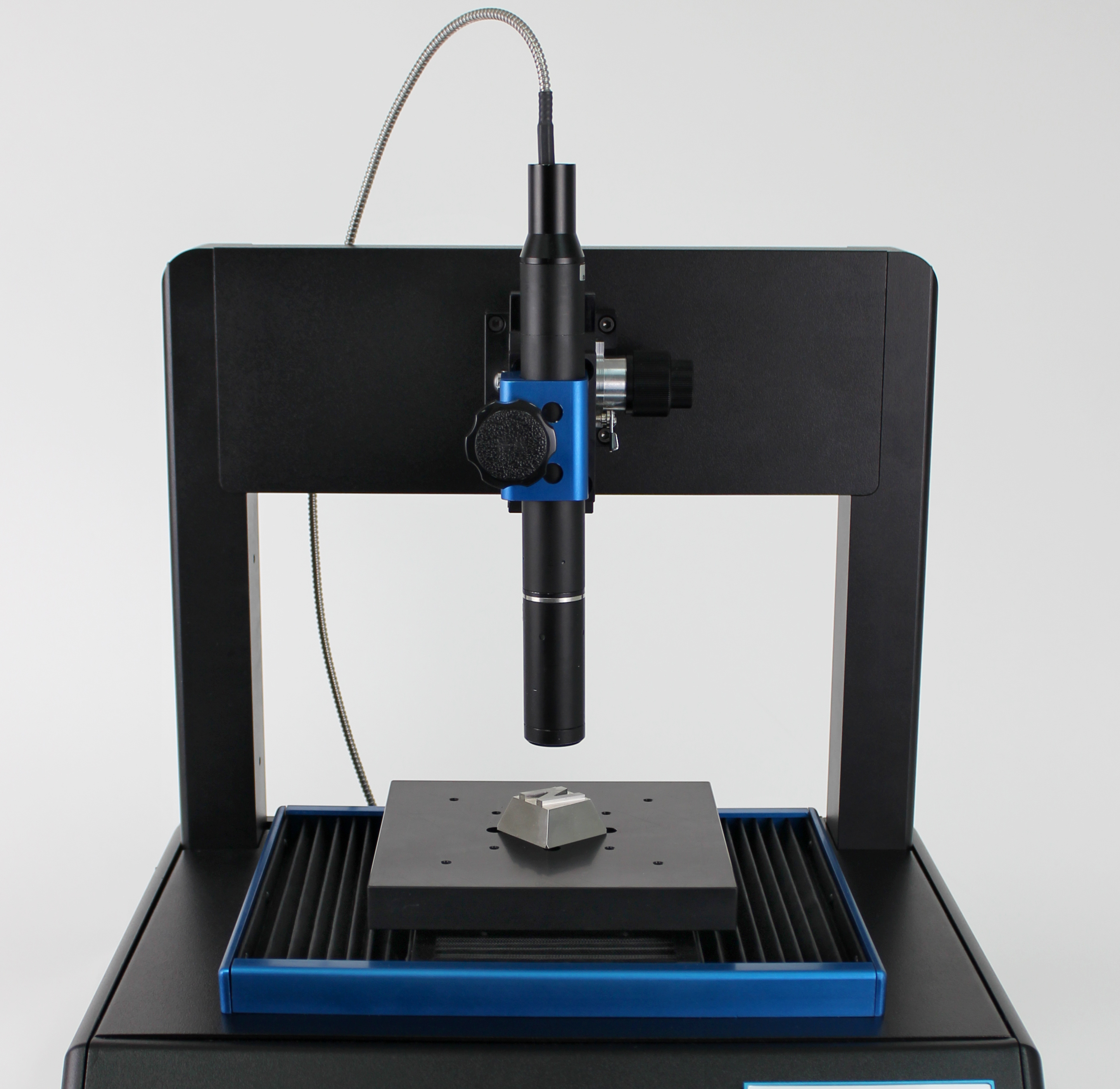
Non-Contact Optical Profilometer

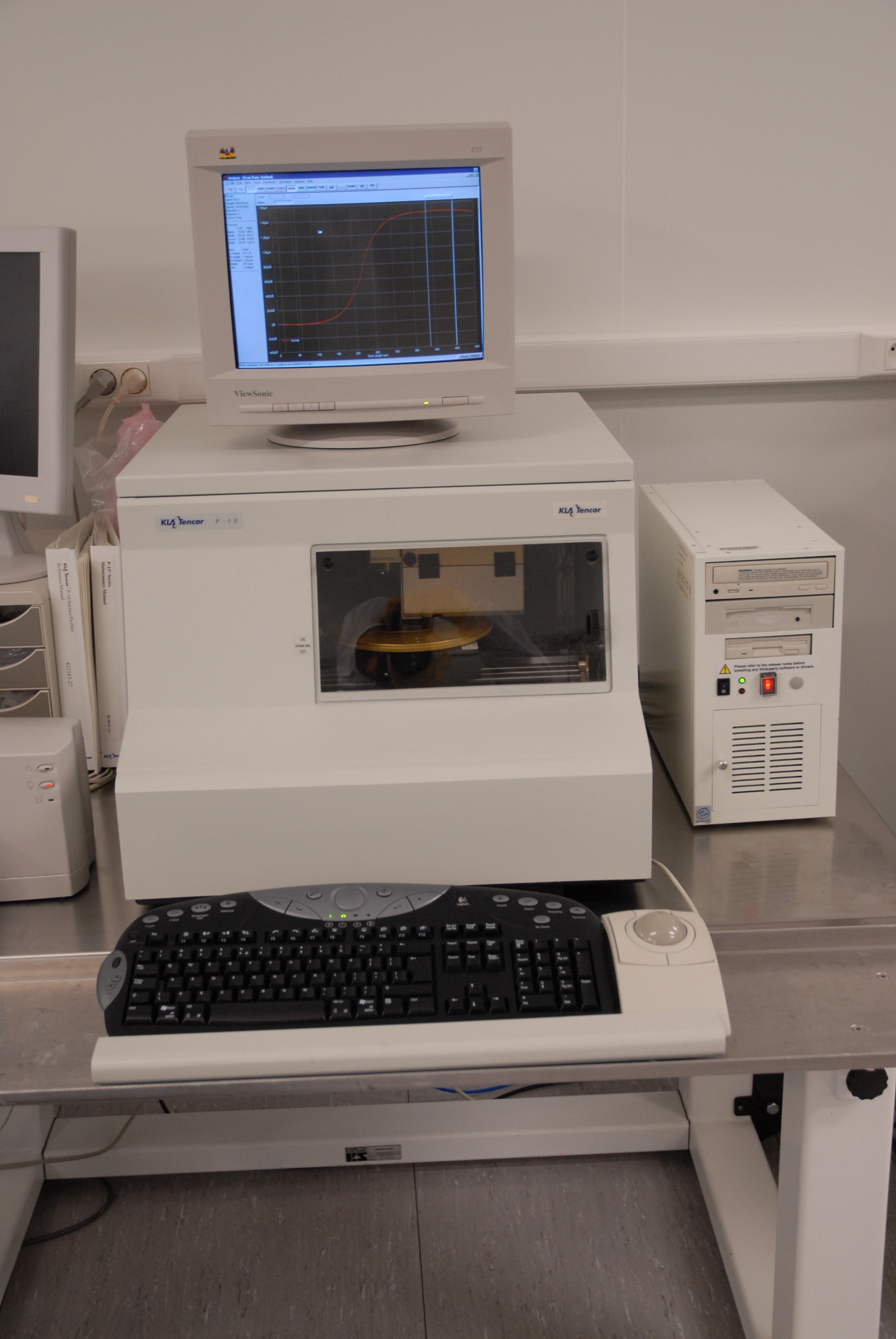
A contact profilometer at LAAS technological facility in Toulouse, France.

A profilometer is a measuring instrument used to measure a surface's profile, in order to quantify its roughness. Critical dimensions as step, curvature, flatness are computed from the surface topography.

While the historical notion of a profilometer was a device similar to a phonograph that measures a surface as the surface is moved relative to the contact profilometer's stylus, this notion is changing with the emergence of numerous non-contact profilometry techniques.

Non-scanning technologies measure the surface topography within a single camera acquisition, XYZ scanning is no longer needed. As a consequence, dynamic changes of topography are measured in real-time. Contemporary profilometers are not only measuring static topography, but now also dynamic topography – such systems are described as time-resolved profilometers.

== Types ==
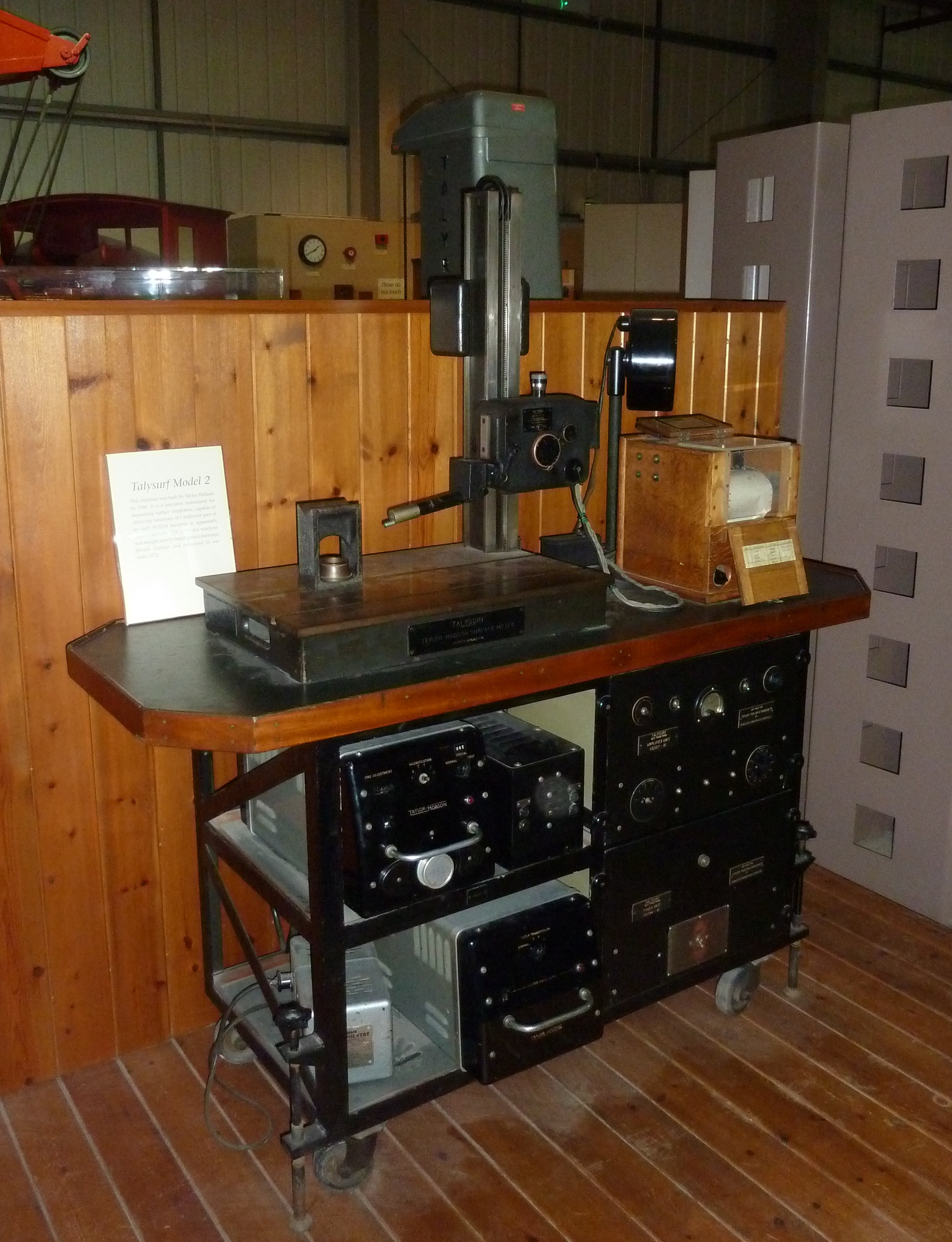
Original 1940s Taylor-Hobson Talysurf surface profile measuring machine

Optical methods include interferometry based methods such as digital holographic microscopy, vertical scanning interferometry/white light interferometry, phase-shifting interferometry, and differential interference contrast microscopy (Nomarski microscopy); focus detection methods such as intensity detection, focus variation, differential detection, critical angle method, astigmatic method, Foucault method, and confocal microscopy; pattern projection methods such as fringe projection, Fourier profilometry, Moire, and pattern reflection methods.

Contact and pseudo-contact methods include stylus profilometer (mechanical profilometer), atomic force microscopy, and scanning tunneling microscopy

== Contact profilometers ==
A diamond stylus is moved vertically in contact with a sample and then moved laterally across the sample for a specified distance and specified contact force. A profilometer can measure small surface variations in vertical stylus displacement as a function of position. A typical profilometer can measure small vertical features ranging in height from 10 nanometres to 1 millimetre. The height position of the diamond stylus generates an analog signal which is converted into a digital signal, stored, analyzed, and displayed. The radius of diamond stylus ranges from 20 nanometres to 50 μm, and the horizontal resolution is controlled by the scan speed and data signal sampling rate. The stylus tracking force can range from less than 1 to 50 milligrams.

Advantages of contact profilometers include acceptance, surface independence, resolution, it is a direct technique with no modeling required. Most of the world's surface finish standards are written for contact profilometers. To follow the prescribed methodology, this type of profilometer is often required. Contacting the surface is often an advantage in dirty environments where non-contact methods can end up measuring surface contaminants instead of the surface itself. Because the stylus is in contact with the surface, this method is not sensitive to surface reflectance or color. The stylus tip radius can be as small as 20 nanometres, significantly better than white-light optical profiling. Vertical resolution is typically sub-nanometer as well.

== Non-contact profilometers ==
An optical profilometer is a non-contact method for providing much of the same information as a stylus based profilometer. There are many different techniques which are currently being employed, such as laser triangulation (triangulation sensor), confocal microscopy (used for profiling very small objects), coherence scanning interferometry, and digital holography.

Advantages of optical profilometers are speed, reliability and spot size. For small steps and requirements to do 3D scanning, because the non-contact profilometer does not touch the surface the scan speeds are dictated by the light reflected from the surface and the speed of the acquisition electronics. For doing large steps, a 3D scan on an optical profiler can be much slower than a 2D scan on a stylus profiler. Optical profilometers do not touch the surface and therefore cannot be damaged by surface wear or careless operators. Many non-contact profilometers are solid-state which tends to reduce the required maintenance significantly. The spot size, or lateral resolution, of optical methods ranges from a few micrometres down to sub micrometre.

=== Time-resolved profilometers ===
Self-Healing-Polymer from Tosoh Corporation (Japan) measured by Digital Holographic Microscope

MEMS Ultrasonic-Transducers measured at 8 MHz in stroboscopic mode

Non-scanning technologies as digital holographic microscopy enable 3D topography measurement in real-time. 3D topography is measured from a single camera acquisition as a consequence the acquisition rate is only limited by the camera acquisition rate, some systems measure topography at a frame rate of 1000 fps. Time-resolved systems enable measurement of topography changes as healing of smart materials or measurement of moving specimens. Time-resolved profilometers can be combined with a stroboscopic unit to measure MEMS vibrations in the MHz range. The stroboscopic unit provides excitation signal to the MEMS and provides trigger signal to light source and camera.

The advantage of time-resolved profilometers is that they are robust against vibrations. Unlike scanning methods, time-resolved profilometer acquisition time is in the milliseconds range. There is no need of vertical calibration: vertical measurement does not depend on a scanning mechanism, digital holographic microscopy vertical measurement has an intrinsic vertical calibration based on laser source wavelength. Samples are not static and there is response of the specimen topography to external stimulus. With on-flight measurement the topography of a moving sample is acquired with short exposure time. MEMS vibrations measurement can be accomplished when the system is combined with a stroboscopic unit.

=== Fiber-based optical profilometers ===
Optical fiber-based optical profilometers scan surfaces with optical probes which send light interference signals back to the profilometer detector via an optical fiber. Fiber-based probes can be physically located hundreds of meters away from the detector enclosure, without signal degradation. The additional advantages of using fiber-based optical profilometers are flexibility, long profile acquisition, ruggedness, and ease of incorporating into industrial processes. With the small diameter of certain probes, surfaces can be scanned even inside hard-to-reach spaces, such as narrow crevices or small-diameter tubes.

Because these probes generally acquire one point at a time and at high sample speeds, acquisition of long (continuous) surface profiles is possible. Scanning can take place in hostile environments, including very hot or cryogenic temperatures, or in radioactive chambers, while the detector is located at a distance, in a human-safe environment. Fiber-based probes are easily installed in-process, such as above moving webs or mounted onto a variety of positioning systems.

== Applications ==
A furrow profilometer is used for the measurement of the cross-sectional geometry of furrows and corrugations, and is important in furrow assessments.

=== Surface analysis and quality control ===
Profilometers are widely used to evaluate surface finish, texture, and roughness in various industrial processes. They detect deviations from desired surface specifications and support quality control in manufacturing sectors.

=== Semiconductors and microelectronics ===
In the fabrication of semiconductor devices, profilometers are essential for analyzing surface topography, step height, and thin film structures. They assist in monitoring etching, deposition, and lithography processes.

=== Medical devices and biomaterials ===
Profilometry is employed in the inspection of implants and biomedical surfaces, ensuring biocompatibility and functional surface characteristics.

=== Optical component fabrication ===
Profilometers are crucial for inspecting precision optical components such as laser mirrors, prisms, and super-polished glass flats, where sub-nanometer roughness is often required.

=== 3D surface profiling and nanotechnology ===
Advanced profilometers enable high-resolution 3D surface characterization in fields like MEMS (Micro-Electro-Mechanical Systems), microfluidics, and nanotechnology, where accurate measurement of micro- and nano-scale structures is essential.

=== Renewable energy and photovoltaic surfaces ===
Profilometers are increasingly used in the characterization of textured surfaces in photovoltaic (PV) cells. Accurate surface topography measurements help optimize light trapping and surface passivation in solar cells, improving their efficiency and durability.

== See also ==
- Road profilometery
- Surface metrology
