= Topography =

Study of the forms of land surfaces in earth

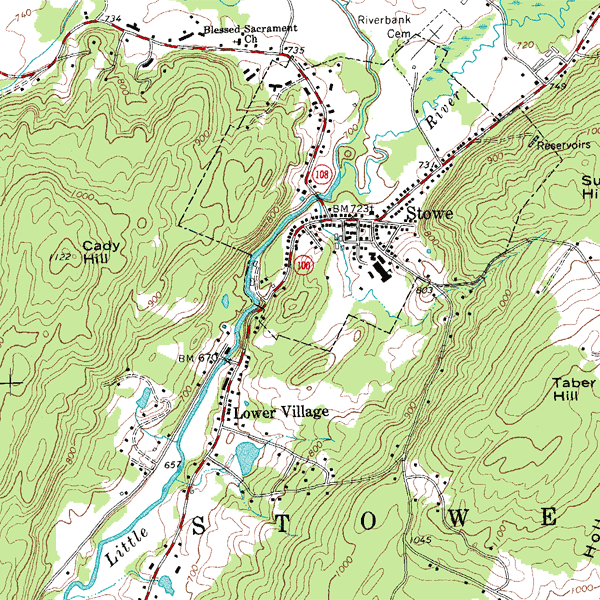
A topographic map of Stowe, Vermont with contour lines

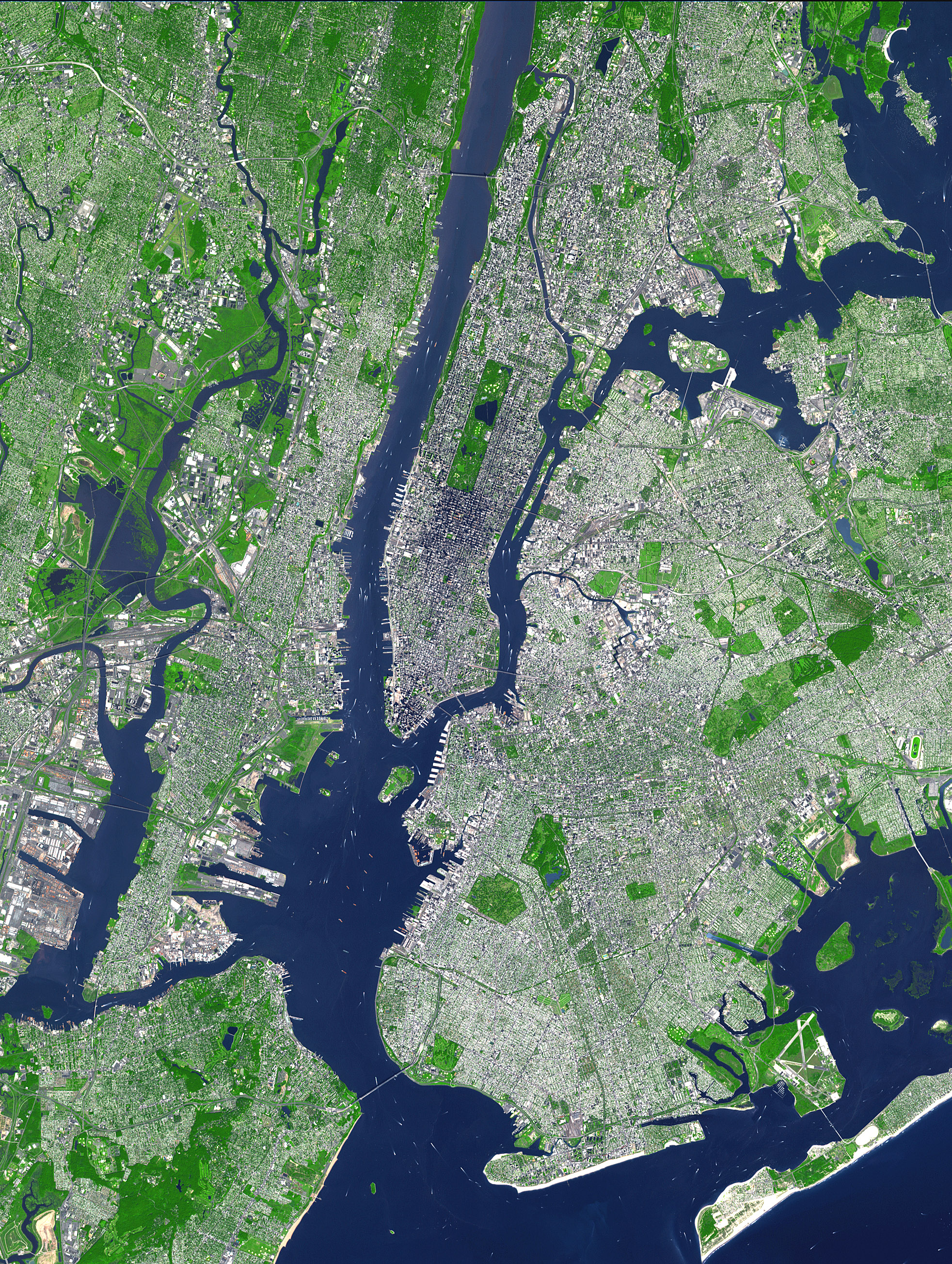
This false-color satellite image illustrates topography of the urban core of the New York metropolitan area, with Manhattan at its center.

Topography is the study of forms and features of land surfaces. The topography of an area may refer to landforms and features themselves, or a description or depiction in maps.

Topography is a field of geoscience and planetary science, and is concerned with local detail in general, including not only relief, but also natural, artificial, and cultural features such as roads, land boundaries, and buildings. In the United States, topography often means specifically relief, even though the USGS topographic maps record not just elevation contours, but also roads, populated places, structures, land boundaries, and so on.

Topography in a narrow sense involves the recording of relief or terrain, the three-dimensional quality of the surface, and the identification of specific landforms; this is also known as geomorphometry. In modern usage, this involves the generation of elevation data in digital form (DEM). It is often considered to include the graphic representation of the landform on a map by a variety of cartographic relief depiction techniques, including contour lines, hypsometric tints, and relief shading.

== Etymology ==
The term topography originated in ancient Greece and continued in ancient Rome, as the detailed description of a place. The word comes from the Greek τόπος (topos, "place") and -γραφία (-graphia, "writing"). In classical literature this refers to writing about a place or places, what is now largely called 'local history'. In Britain and in Europe in general, the word topography is still sometimes used in its original sense.

Detailed military surveys in Britain (beginning in the late eighteenth century) were called Ordnance Surveys, and this term was used into the 20th century as a generic for topographic surveys and maps. The earliest scientific surveys in France were the Cassini maps after the family who produced them over four generations. The term "topographic surveys" appears to be American in origin. The earliest detailed surveys in the United States were made by the "Topographical Bureau of the Army", formed during the War of 1812, which became the Corps of Topographical Engineers in 1838. After the work of national mapping was assumed by the United States Geological Survey in 1878, the term topographical remained as a general term for detailed surveys and mapping programs, and has been adopted by most other nations as standard.

In the 20th century, the term topography started to be used to describe surface description in other fields where mapping in a broader sense is used, particularly in medical fields such as neurology.

== Objectives ==
An objective of topography is to determine the position of any feature or more generally any point in terms of both a horizontal coordinate system such as latitude, longitude, and altitude. Identifying (naming) features, and recognizing typical landform patterns are also part of the field.

A topographic study may be made for a variety of reasons: military planning and geological exploration have been primary motivators to start survey programs, but detailed information about terrain and surface features is essential for the planning and construction of any major civil engineering, public works, or reclamation projects.

== Techniques ==
There are a variety of approaches to studying topography. Which method(s) to use depends on the scale and size of the area under study, its accessibility, and the quality of existing surveys.

=== Field survey ===
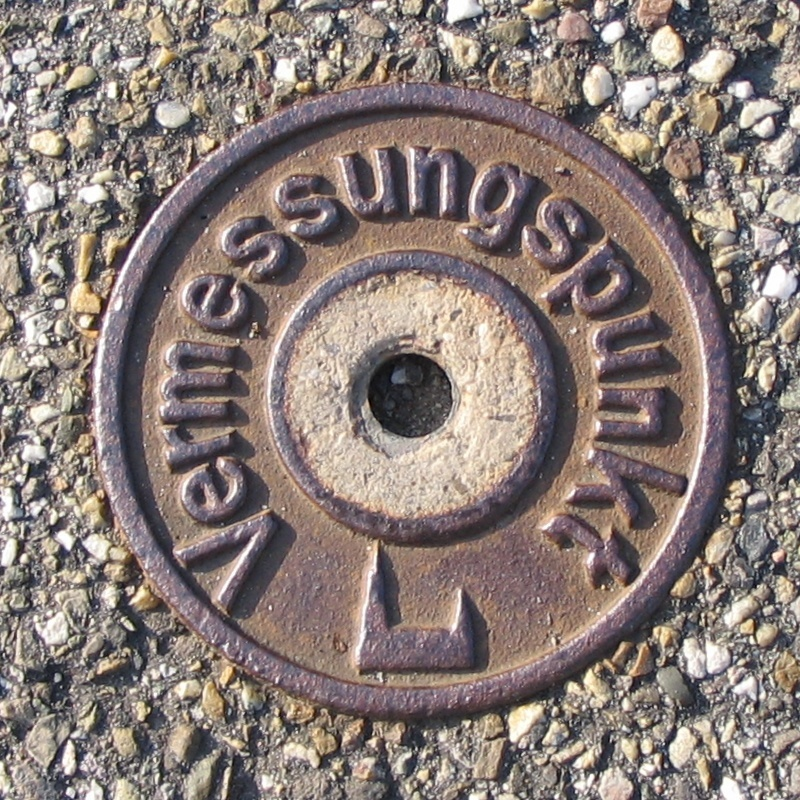
A surveying point in Germany

Surveying helps determine accurately the terrestrial or three-dimensional space position of points and the distances and angles between them using leveling instruments such as theodolites, dumpy levels and clinometers.

GPS and other global navigation satellite systems (GNSS) are also used.

Work on one of the first topographic maps was begun in France by Giovanni Domenico Cassini, the great Italian astronomer.

Even though remote sensing has greatly sped up the process of gathering information, and has allowed greater accuracy control over long distances, the direct survey still provides the basic control points and framework for all topographic work, whether manual or GIS-based.

In areas where there has been an extensive direct survey and mapping program (most of Europe and the Continental U.S., for example), the compiled data forms the basis of basic digital elevation datasets such as USGS DEM data. This data must often be "cleaned" to eliminate discrepancies between surveys, but it still forms a valuable set of information for large-scale analysis.

The original American topographic surveys (or the British "Ordnance" surveys) involved not only the recording of relief, but the identification of landmark features and vegetative land cover.

=== Remote sensing ===
Remote sensing is a general term for geodata collection at a distance from the subject area.

==== Use of laser scanners ====
Topographic surveys using laser scanners, commonly known as lidar (LIght Detection And Ranging), are a method for capturing high-resolution spatial data of landscapes, architectural structures, and terrains with a vertical accuracy of 10 centimeters. These surveys utilise a laser scanner that emits millions of laser pulses every second. The travel time of these pulses as they are reflected or bounce back from the ground are measured, allowing for the creation of a detailed point cloud that represents the scanned environment. Products of lidar include Digital elevation models (DEMs), which are a representation of the bare earth topographic surface (excluding vegetation, buildings and other surface objects).

==== Passive sensor methodologies ====
Besides their role in photogrammetry, aerial and satellite imagery can be used to identify and delineate terrain features and more general land-cover features. Certainly they have become more and more a part of geovisualization, whether maps or GIS systems. False-color and non-visible spectra imaging can also help determine the lie of the land by delineating vegetation and other land-use information more clearly. Images can be in visible colours and in other spectra.

==== Photogrammetry ====
Photogrammetry is a measurement technique for which the co-ordinates of the points in 3D of an object are determined by the measurements made in two photographic images (or more) taken starting from different positions, usually from different passes of an aerial photography flight. In this technique, the common points are identified on each image. A line of sight (or ray) can be built from the camera location to the point on the object. It is the intersection of its rays (triangulation) that determines the relative three-dimensional position of the point. Known control points can be used to give these relative positions absolute values. More sophisticated algorithms can exploit other information on the scene known a priori (for example, symmetries in certain cases allowing the rebuilding of three-dimensional co-ordinates starting from only one position of the camera).

==== Active sensor methodologies ====
Satellite RADAR mapping is one of the major techniques of generating Digital Elevation Models (see below). Similar techniques are applied in bathymetric surveys using sonar to determine the terrain of the ocean floor. In recent years, lidar, a remote sensing technique that uses a laser instead of radio waves, has increasingly been employed for complex mapping needs such as charting canopies and monitoring glaciers.

== Forms of topographic data ==
Terrain is commonly modelled either using vector (triangulated irregular network or TIN) or gridded (raster image) mathematical models. In the most applications in environmental sciences, the land surface is represented and modelled using gridded models. In civil engineering and entertainment businesses, the most representations of land surface employ some variant of TIN models. In geostatistics, the land surface is commonly modelled as a combination of the two signals – the smooth (spatially correlated) and the rough (noise) signal.

In practice, surveyors first sample heights in an area, then use these to produce a Digital Land Surface Model in the form of a TIN. The DLSM can then be used to visualize terrain, drape remote sensing images, quantify ecological properties of a surface or extract land surface objects. The contour data or any other sampled elevation datasets are not a DLSM. A DLSM implies that elevation is available continuously at each location in the study area, i.e. that the map represents a complete surface. Digital Land Surface Models should not be confused with Digital Surface Models, which can be surfaces of the canopy, buildings and similar objects. For example, in the case of surface models produces using the lidar technology, one can have several surfaces – starting from the top of the canopy to the actual solid earth. The difference between the two surface models can then be used to derive volumetric measures (height of trees etc.).

=== Raw survey data ===
Topographic survey information is historically based upon the notes of surveyors. They may derive naming and cultural information from other local sources (for example, boundary delineation may be derived from local cadastral mapping). While of historical interest, these field notes inherently include errors and contradictions that later stages in map production resolve.

=== Remote sensing data ===
As with field notes, remote sensing data (aerial and satellite photography, for example), is raw and uninterpreted. It may contain holes (due to cloud cover for example) or inconsistencies (due to the timing of specific image captures). Most modern topographic mapping includes a large component of remotely sensed data in its compilation process.

=== Topographic mapping ===
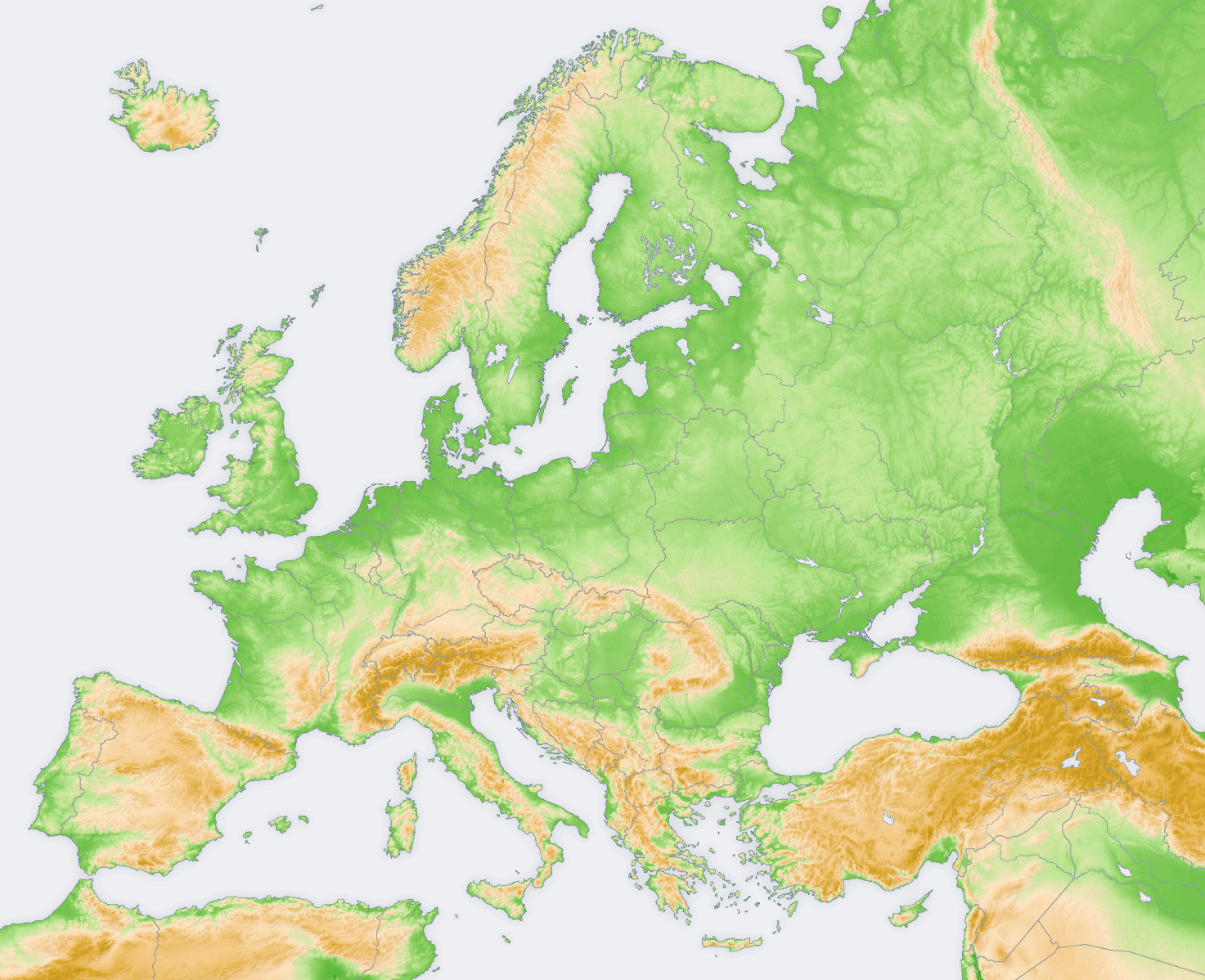
A map of Europe using elevation modeling

In its contemporary definition, topographic mapping shows relief. In the United States, USGS topographic maps show relief using contour lines. The USGS calls maps based on topographic surveys, but without contours, "planimetric maps."

These maps show not only the contours, but also any significant streams or other bodies of water, forest cover, built-up areas or individual buildings (depending on scale), and other features and points of interest.

While not officially "topographic" maps, the national surveys of other nations share many of the same features, and so they are often called "topographic maps."

Existing topographic survey maps, because of their comprehensive and encyclopedic coverage, form the basis for much derived topographic work. Digital Elevation Models, for example, have often been created not from new remote sensing data but from existing paper topographic maps. Many government and private publishers use the artwork (especially the contour lines) from existing topographic map sheets as the basis for their own specialized or updated topographic maps.

Topographic mapping should not be confused with geological mapping. The latter is concerned with underlying structures and processes to the surface, rather than with identifiable surface features.

=== Digital elevation modeling ===
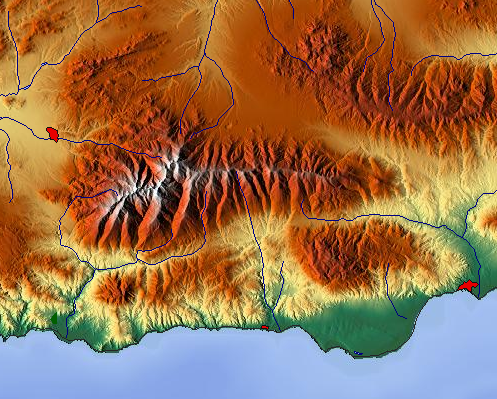
Relief map: Sierra Nevada Mountains, Spain

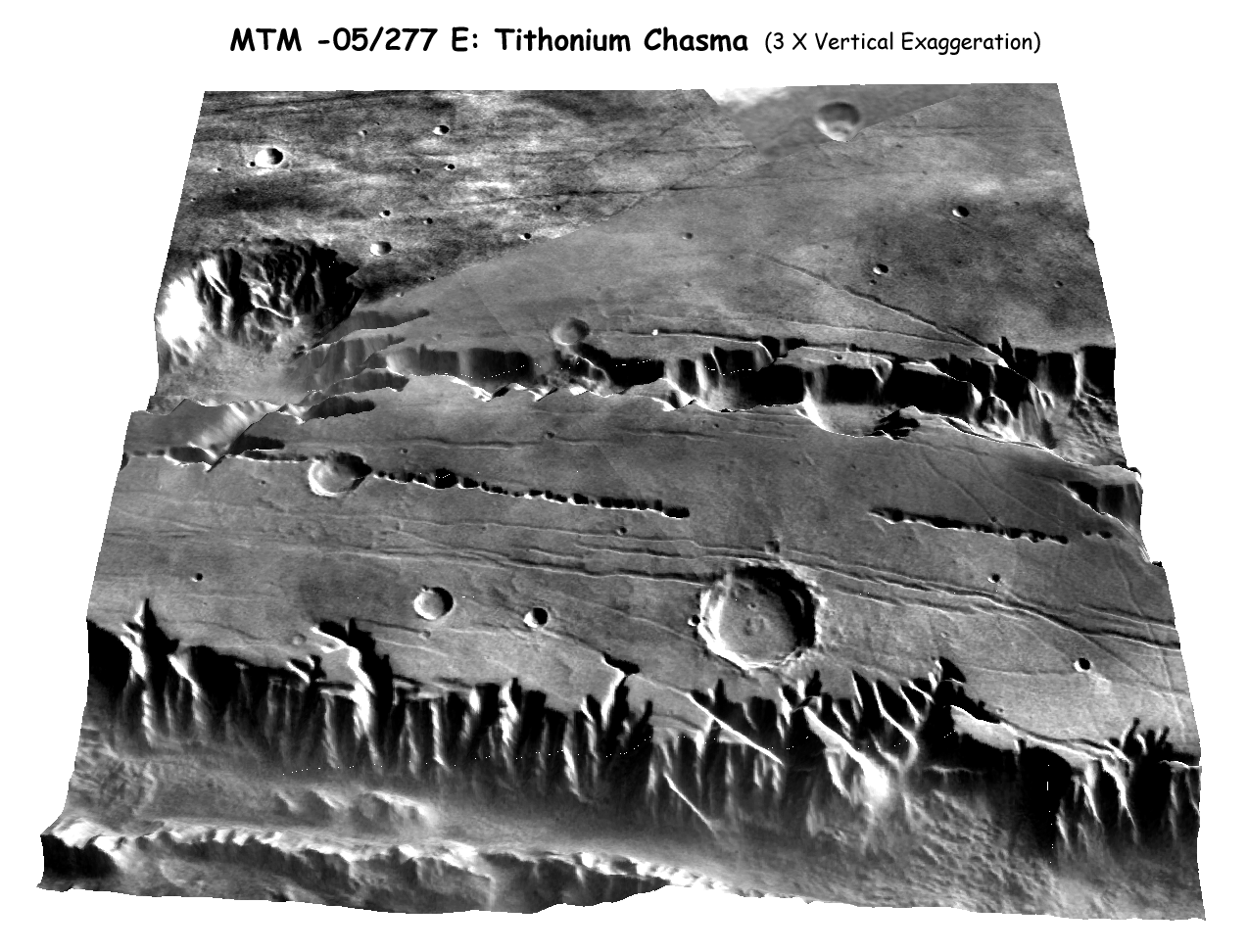
3D rendering of a DEM used for the topography of Mars

The digital elevation model (DEM) is a raster-based digital dataset of the topography (hypsometry and/or bathymetry) of all or part of the Earth (or a telluric planet). The pixels of the dataset are each assigned an elevation value, and a header portion of the dataset defines the area of coverage, the units each pixel covers, and the units of elevation (and the zero-point). DEMs may be derived from existing paper maps and survey data, or they may be generated from new satellite or other remotely sensed radar or sonar data.

=== Topological modeling ===
STL 3D model of Earth without liquid water with 20× elevation exaggeration

A geographic information system (GIS) can recognize and analyze the spatial relationships that exist within digitally stored spatial data. These topological relationships allow complex spatial modelling and analysis to be performed. Topological relationships between geometric entities traditionally include adjacency (what adjoins what), containment (what encloses what), and proximity (how close something is to something else).

- reconstitute a sight in synthesized images of the ground,
- determine a trajectory of overflight of the ground,
- calculate surfaces or volumes,
- trace topographic profiles,

== Topography in other fields ==
Topography has been applied to different science fields. In neuroscience, the neuroimaging discipline uses techniques such as EEG topography for brain mapping. In ophthalmology, corneal topography is used as a technique for mapping the surface curvature of the cornea. In tissue engineering, atomic force microscopy is used to map nanotopography.

In human anatomy, topography is superficial human anatomy.

In mathematics the concept of topography is used to indicate the patterns or general organization of features on a map or as a term referring to the pattern in which variables (or their values) are distributed in a space.

== Topographers ==
Topographers are experts in topography. They study and describe the surface features of a place or region.

== See also ==
- Cartography
- Digital elevation model
- Fall line (topography)
- Geomorphology
- Global Relief Model
- Hypsography
- Marine topography
- Sea-surface topography
- Topographic map
- Orography
