= Fourier profilometry =

Fourier profilometry is a method for measuring profiles using distortions in periodic patterns. The method uses Fourier analysis (a 2-dimensional fast Fourier transform) to determine localized slopes on a curving surface.

This allows a x, y, z coordinate system of the surface to be generated from a single image which has been overlaid with the distortion pattern.

It is used specifically in measuring the shape of the human cornea for use in contact lens design.
