= Phase-shifting interferometry =

Technique used to measure 3D topography using shifted interference

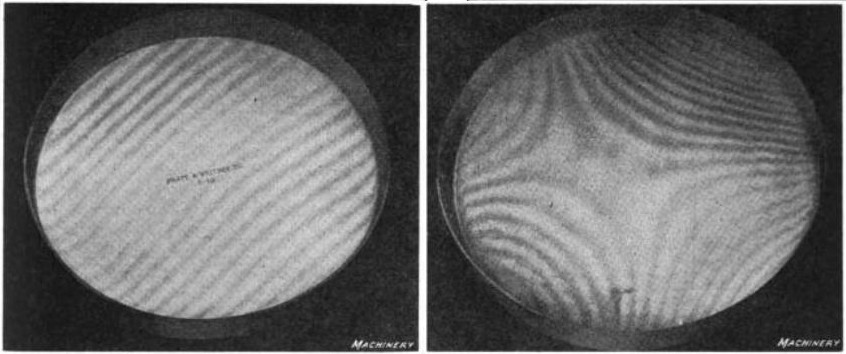
Classic interference fringes on a flat surface under monochromatic light.

Phase-shifting interferometry (PSI) is an optical metrology technique for measuring surface topography and wavefront shape to sub-nanometre precision. It works by recording a short sequence of interferograms, each captured with a known phase offset between the reference and object beams, then solving for the surface height at every pixel simultaneously. Height measurement repeatability is typically below 1 nm, independent of field size. Before PSI, the standard approach was to trace fringe centres in a static interferogram by eye or with image-processing software, which was a labour-intensive, sparse, and unable to resolve the sign of surface deviations from a single image.

== Principle ==
A Twyman–Green interferometer configured as a white-light scanner. In a PSI measurement the reference mirror is stepped by a piezoelectric actuator between frames rather than scanned continuously.

The phase shift is most often introduced by a piezoelectric transducer (PZT) moving the reference mirror in steps of roughly a quarter wavelength of optical path between frames. With at least three frames, the three unknowns at each pixel namely, background intensity, fringe contrast, and surface phase, are over-determined and can be solved with an arctangent formula. The raw output is a wrapped phase map; a phase-unwrapping step removes the 2π jumps to give the final height map. PSI can be implemented in Twyman–Green, Fizeau, Mach–Zehnder, and common-path configurations.

== History ==
P. Carré described a four-frame algorithm tolerant of unknown step sizes as early as 1966. The pivotal step toward practical use came in 1974, when Bruning and colleagues at Bell Laboratories built a fully digital, computer-controlled system for testing optical surfaces and lenses. This is often cited as the birth of modern PSI. Widespread industrial adoption came in the 1980s as affordable CCD arrays and desktop computers made real-time phase calculation possible. Comprehensive reviews by Creath (1988) and Greivenkamp and Bruning (1992) cemented PSI as the standard framework for precision interferometric metrology.

The four-step algorithm with π/2 steps is the most common basic form. Schwider and colleagues (1983) showed that a five-step variant largely cancels errors from PZT miscalibration. Hariharan, Oreb, and Eiju (1987) independently derived the same formula, now known as the Schwider–Hariharan algorithm. The main remaining error sources are mechanical vibration during acquisition, detector nonlinearity, and stray reflections; higher-order algorithms and simultaneous multi-channel designs have been developed to address each of these.

== Applications ==
Common uses include optical component testing, semiconductor wafer and MEMS characterisation, and precision-engineering quality control.
