= Waviness =

Measure of the periodicity of surface roughness

Waviness is the measurement of the more widely spaced component of surface texture. It is a broader view of roughness because it is more strictly defined as "the irregularities whose spacing is greater than the roughness sampling length". It can occur from machine or work deflections, chatter, residual stress, vibrations, or heat treatment. Waviness should also be distinguished from flatness, both by its shorter spacing and its characteristic of being typically periodic in nature.

== Parameters ==
There are several parameters for expressing waviness height, the most common being Wa & Wt, for average waviness and total waviness, respectively. In the lateral direction along the surface, the waviness spacing, Wsm, is another parameter that describes the mean spacing between periodic waviness peaks. There are numerous measurement settings which influence these resultant parameter values, which are mentioned below. One of the most important is the waviness evaluation length, which is the length in which the waviness parameters are determined. Within this length the waviness profile is determined. This is a surface texture profile that has the shorter roughness characteristics filtered out, or removed; it also does not include any profile changes due to changes in workpiece geometry that are either unintentional (flatness) or intentional (form).

Waviness is included in the ISO standards ISO 4287 and ISO 16610-21 as well as the U.S. standard ASME B46.1, and it is part of the surface texture symbol used in engineering drawings.

== Measurement ==
The measurement of the waviness can be done with a variety of instruments, including both surface finish profilometers and roundness instruments. The nature of these instruments is continually progressing and now includes both stylus-based contact instruments as well as optical & laser-based non-contact instruments. In earlier instruments, the measurement output was inherently linked to the instrument itself, whereas there is now emerging some divergence between the instrument that collects the surface profile data and the analytical software that is able to evaluate this data.

Examples of two earlier generation instruments are the waveometer or a microtopographer. A waveometer uses a plastic tip that is connected to an electronic pickup which then measures the surface variations. The measurement is recorded as an electronic signal which is amplified and split into two signals: a high band and a low band. For measuring a ball bearing, the low band signal records variations that occur every four to seventeen times per revolution and the high band signal records variations that occur seventeen to 330 times per revolution; the low band is the waviness. These bands are transmitted to an oscilloscope for analysis.

== Use ==
Waviness measurements are not as common as roughness measurement however there are important applications. For example, waviness in bearing balls and bearing races is one of the reasons for vibrations and noise in ball bearings. Other application examples are waviness in flat milled sealing surfaces, "orange peel" on painted surfaces, and chatter on round shaft surfaces.

== Related standards ==
- ANSI/ASME B46.1
- ISO 4287
