= Twyman =

Twyman is an English surname. Notable people with the surname include:

- Frank Twyman (1876–1959), British designer of optical instruments, co-inventor of the Twyman–Green interferometer
- Jack Twyman (1934–2012), American basketball player and sports broadcaster
- Jaylen Twyman (born 1999), American football player
- Kathryn Twyman (born 1987), Canadian rower
- Luska Twyman (1913–1988), American politician from Kentucky
- Michael Twyman (born 1934), British academic
- Robert Twyman (1897–1976), U.S. Representative from Illinois
- William Anthony Twyman, who gave his name to the Twyman's law
