= MEMS testing =

MEMS testing is one of the processes in the development of a MEMS device. It is a collection of testing methods such as electrical, mechanical and environment tests.

== Motivation ==
When looking at the electronic market it becomes obvious, as there is a need for production output, high system performance, product reliability and long lifecycle, for MEMS to create trust in the eyes of customers. If those conditions would not be met customers would not invest into technologies using MEMS, which justifies the need for testing as a part of a high quality standard.

Testing is also fairly important from an economical point of view. As it is said that the failure cost increase by a factor of ten for each stage before it gets discovered. Most MEMS producers check their products at two distinct stages(at the wafer level, and the packaging), as well as random sampling on every stage. If one includes this into cost calculation for a MEMS device the costs for testing amounts to 20-50% of the overall unit costs. Even when looking at producers that manufacture MEMS, and CMOS devices it is not really possible to reduce the costs by including the economy of scopes effect for testing, as both types of device. This is because even though about 80% of the processing is shared, only 20% of the tests are. To decrease these costs for U.S. manufactures the National Institute of Standards and Technologies(NIST) conducted several workshops and questionnaires to tackle this issue and increase competitiveness of US companies.

== Testing ==
Due to the wide variety of MEMS it is hard to be very specific as of what is tested the table below shows what is tested in general:

Material Property Test	Fabrication Test	Device Level Metrology
Residual Stress	Doping	Grain Size
Fracture / Failure Mechanism	Etching Parameters	Surface Roughness
Etch parameters (shape and dimension)	Deposition methods	High Resolution Cross Section
Elastic Modulus	Post Release Etching	Micro Scale Crack Propagation
Poisson's ratio	Post release Drying (Stiction)	Real-Time Performance settling time, amplitude of movement or resonance frequency
Fracture Toughness		
Electrical properties		
Interfacial Strength		
Coefficient of Thermal Expansion		

== Different technologies ==
To test MEMS researchers came up with a wide variety of techniques that can display certain values. However, there is no single technology that can cover all; each has strengths as well as weaknesses.

Below is a list with all major and some minor technologies employed in MEMS testing:

- Atomic force microscopy (AFM)
- Confocal microscopy (CM)
- Digital holographic microscopy (DHM)
- Laser Doppler vibrometer (LDV)
- Optical microscopy (OM)
- Scanning electron microscopy (SEM)
- Stroboscopic video microscopy (SVM)
- White light interferometry (WLI)

Following technologies were experimented with but are no longer considered for MEMS testing:

- Beam deflection
- Electronic speckle pattern interferometry (ESPI)
- Ellipsometry
- Light scattering
- Spectroscopy

All these technologies have strengths and weaknesses, so in order to maximize the effectiveness of test equipment researchers combined technologies. For instance Christian Rembe, former researcher at UC Berkeley, combined laser doppler vibrometry, white light interferometry and strobe video microscopy into one tool to eliminate each technologies weakness.
