= Zero spacing flux =

In interferometry, the zero spacing flux (ZSF) refers to the estimated integrated flux density within the field of view of an interferometer that would be measured by a (potentially hypothetical) single-dish telescope possessing the same primary beam as the interferometer. This value does not represent a direct measurement, but rather an extrapolation based on both single-dish observation and interferometric data. Sometimes, in place of single-dish observations, dense array configurations can be used to capture large-scale emission data.

The ZSF plays a crucial role in the construction of accurate images of astronomical sources, especially those that are extended across the field of view. Because interferometers cannot directly measure visibilities at zero separation between antennas (zero baseline), the ZSF remains unknown. This missing information can lead to a phenomenon known as the "missing flux problem." In the reconstructed image, extended sources appear to be surrounded by a faint, negative halo of brightness.

By merging single-dish observations with the interferometric data, astronomers can account for the flux density of the largest structures in the sky, which are not captured by interferometers due to their limited spatial resolution.

== See also ==
- CLEAN (algorithm)
