= Linnik interferometer =

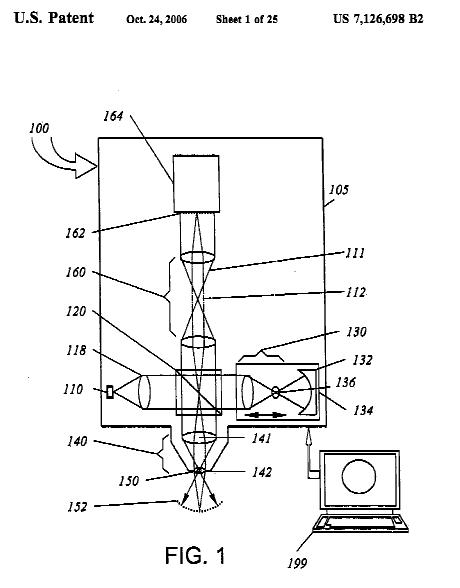

A Linnik interferometer is a two-beam interferometer used in microscopy and surface contour measurements or topography. The basic configuration is the same as a Michelson interferometer. What distinguishes the Linnik configuration is the use of measurement optics in the reference arm, which essentially duplicate the objective measurement optics in the measurement arm. The advantage of this design is its ability to compensate for chromatic dispersion and other optical aberrations.

In the image of a Linnik interferometer at right, 110 is the light source, 164 the detector. The beamsplitter 120 produces the two arms of the interferometer. The measurement arm 140 contains an objective lens 141 for imaging the surface to be studied 152. The reference arm 130 contains complementary optics to compensate for aberrations produced in the measurement arm.

== See also ==
- List of types of interferometers
