= Frank Twyman =

British designer of optical instruments (1876–1959)

Frank Twyman FRS FInstP
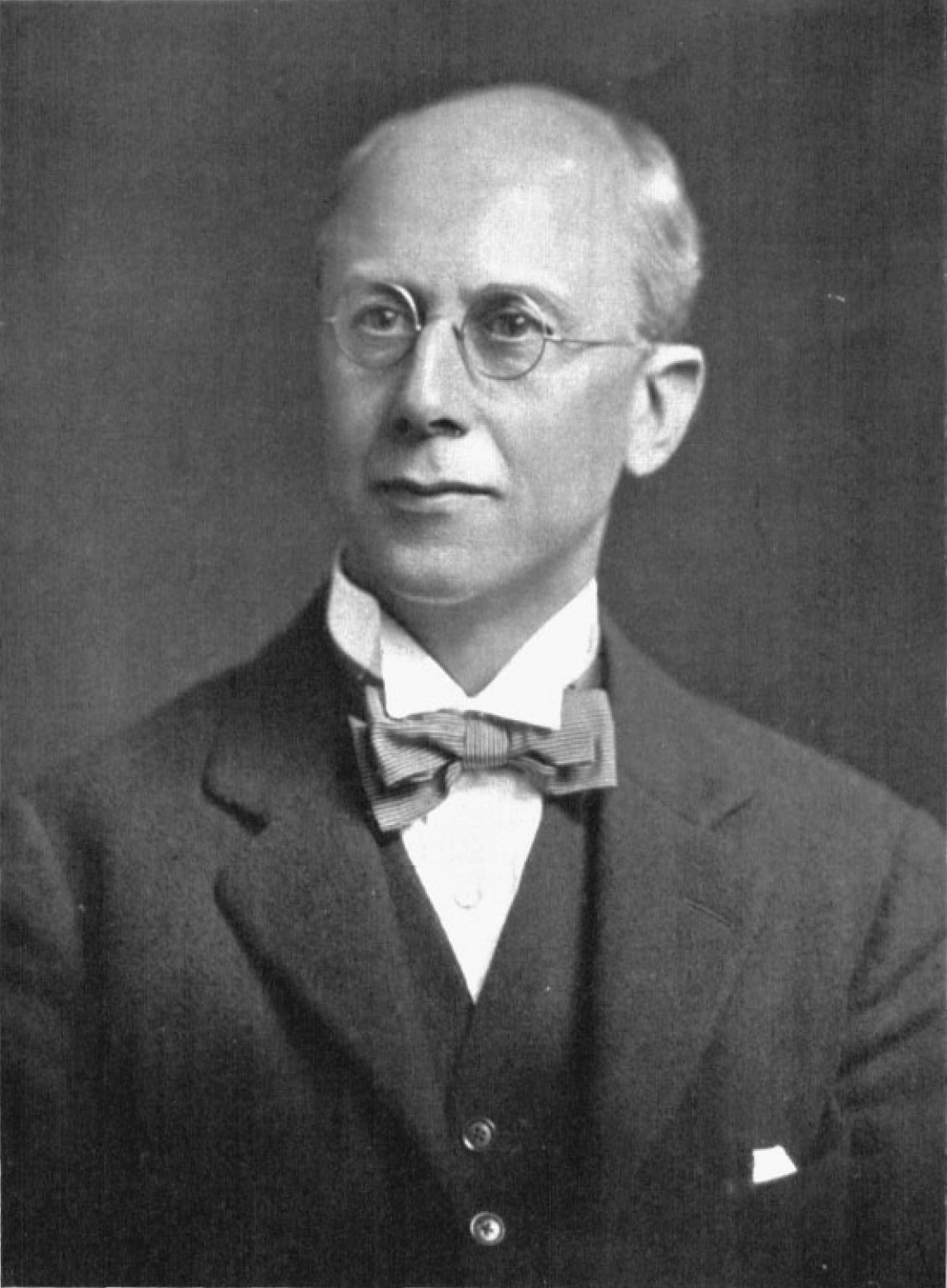
- Twyman in 1929
- Born: 17 November 1876; Canterbury, Kent, England
- Died: 6 March 1959 (aged 82); St Pancras, London, England
- Education: Simon Langton School; Finsbury Technical College; Central Technical College
- Occupation: Designer of optical instruments
- Spouse: Phillipine Katherine Elisabeth Hilger (m. 1906)
- Children: 4
- Engineering career
- Discipline: Optical engineering
- Employers: Adam Hilger Ltd.; Hilger & Watts
- Significant design: Twyman–Green interferometer
- Awards: Duddell Medal (1926); John Price Wetherill Medal (1926)

Frank Twyman FRS FInstP (17 November 1876 – 6 March 1959) was a British designer of optical instruments and co-inventor of the Twyman–Green interferometer.

== Early life ==
Twyman was born in Canterbury, Kent, England on 17 November 1876, the seventh child of nine to Jane Lefevre and ropemaker George Edmund Twyman. He attended Simon Langton School before doing an electrical engineering course at Finsbury Technical College, followed by a Siemens scholarship at Central Technical College in London. In 1897 he co-authored his first scientific paper.

== Career ==
Twyman worked briefly for the Fowler Waring Cables Company testing telephone cables, before beginning work in 1898 for optical instrument manufacturing firm Adam Hilger as an assistant to Otto Hilger. Following the death of Otto Hilger, Twyman became managing director of the firm. He remained in post until 1946 when he became chairman.

Until 1910 he managed the design and construction of all of the firms new equipment. This included a deviation wavelength spectrometer and a spectrograph made using quartz rather than glass to enable the observation of the ultraviolet spectrum.

Between 1918 and 1923 with foreman Alfred Green he developed the Twyman–Green interferometer, based on the Michelson interferometer, and used principally for testing optical equipment.

In 1924 he was elected a fellow of the Royal Society. In 1926 he was awarded both the Duddell Medal of the Physical Society and the John Price Wetherill Medal of the Franklin Institute.

In 1942 he published the book Prism and Lens Making. In 1956 he won the Gold medal of the Society for Applied Spectroscopy.

He also advised the firm E. R. Watts and Son until they merged in 1948 with Adam Hilger Ltd. to form Hilger & Watts Ltd. He remained an advisor to Hilger & Watts until his death.

== Personal life ==
In 1906 Twyman married Phillipine Katherine Elisabeth Hilger, daughter of Otto Hilger. They went on to have four children together. In 1956 he authored a book on his family history, An East Kent Family. He also wrote a pamphlet of his views on economics, and a book on apprenticeships.

He died at home on 6 March 1959 in St Pancras, London.

== Books ==
- Twyman, Frank (1923). Wavelength Tables for Spectrum Analysis. London: Hilger.
- —— (1926). Two Lectures on the Development and Present Position of Chemical Analysis by Emission Spectra. London: A. Hilger.
- ——; Allsopp, Cecil Benjamin (1932). The Practice of Absorption Spectrophotometry with Hilger Instruments. London: Adam Hilger, Ltd.
- —— (1938). Spectrochemical Abstracts, 1933–1937. London: Adam Hilger, Ltd.
- —— (1938). Spectrochemical Analysis in 1938. London: Adam Hilger, Ltd.
- —— (1939). Industrial Application of Spectrography in the Non-Ferrous Metal Industry. London: Adam Hilger, Ltd.
- —— (1941). The Spectrochemical Analysis of Metals and Alloys. London: Charles Griffin & Company.
- —— (1942). Prism and Lens Making. London: Adam Hilger, Ltd.
- ——; Knight, Henry Newcome (1944). Apprenticeship for a Skilled Trade. London: Charles Griffin & Company.
- —— (1951). Metal Spectroscopy. London: Charles Griffin & Company.
- —— (1953). Some New Proposals for the Amelioration of the Balance of Payments Position.
- —— (1954). Optical Glassworking. London: Hilger & Watts.
- —— (1956). An East Kent Family. Glasgow University Press.
