= Coherence scanning interferometry =

Method for measuring optical surfaces

Coherence scanning interferometry (CSI) is any of a class of optical surface measurement methods wherein the localization of interference fringes during a scan of optical path length provides a means to determine surface characteristics such as topography, transparent film structure, and optical properties. CSI is currently the most common interference microscopy technique for areal surface topography measurement. The term "CSI" was adopted by the International Organization for Standardization (ISO).

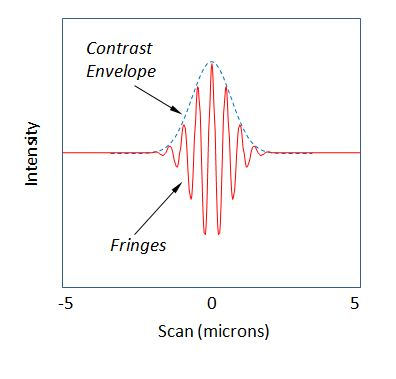
Characteristic CSI signal

The technique encompasses but is not limited to instruments that use spectrally broadband, visible sources (white light) to achieve interference fringe localization. CSI uses either fringe localization alone or in combination with interference fringe phase, depending on the surface type, desired surface topography repeatability and software capabilities. The table below compiles alternative terms that conform at least in part to the above definition.

Acronym	Term	Reference
CSI	Coherence scanning interferometry	
CPM	Coherence probe microscope	
CSM	Coherence scanning microscope	
CR	Coherence radar	
CCI	Coherence correlation interferometry	
MCM	Mirau correlation microscope	
WLI	White light interferometry	
WLSI	White light scanning interferometry	
SWLI	Scanning white light interferometry	
WLS	White Light Scanner	
WLPSI	White light phase-shifting interferometry	
VSI	Vertical scanning interferometry	
RSP	Rough surface profiler	
IRS	Infrared scanning	
OCT	Full-field optical coherence tomography	
