= Mirau interferometer =

The figure shows the optical path of a Mirau-interferometer. Reference beam (5–4–6) and object beam (5–7–6) have identical optical path length and can thus cause white light interference. Parts of the Mirau interferometer: 1. Lens of the microscope, 2. Semitransparent mirror, 3. Object surface, 4. Reference mirror with reference beam, 5. First reflection of reference beam, 6. Third reflection of reference beam, 7. Reflection of object beam

A Mirau interferometer works on the same basic principle as a Michelson interferometer. The difference between the two is in the physical location of the reference arm. The reference arm of a Mirau interferometer is located within a microscope objective assembly.

It is named after André Henri Mirau, who filed a patent on the concept in 1949.

A schematic of a Mirau interferometer is shown on the right. At the beam splitter the source light is split into a reference path (reflected) and a sampling path (transmitted onto the sample). On the comparison face there is a mirrored circle in the middle. The two paths recombine to form an interference image. By changing the z position of the sample, interference images are acquired at a sequence of path (phase) differences: 0, λ/4, λ/2, and 3λ/4. These interference maps are functions of background intensity, fringe modulation, and phase. Three such images provide enough information to solve for the topographic image of a sample.

This orientation is often used in optical profilometers due to the increase in stability between the sample and reference path lengths.

== Immersion Mirau interferometer ==
An immersion Mirau interferometer is a modification of a Mirau interferometer, in which the light path is immersed in a liquid medium. One application of an immersion Mirau interferometer is to image cells with growth medium. Since the index of refraction of the medium is substantially different from that of the neighboring air, each millimeter of medium would introduce a path length difference from the reference wave, and ideal interference conditions are lost. Filling the microscope optics with medium restores the ideal interference conditions.

== Simultaneous immersion Mirau interferometer ==
In immersion Mirau interferometry, the interference patterns needed to reproduce the image are acquired at different times and vibrations, if they exist, prevent maintaining the desirable phase shifts between consecutive frames. Thus immersion Mirau interferometry is very sensitive to vibrations. One solution is to acquire all interference images at the same time. This is known as a simultaneous immersion Mirau interferometer.

== See also ==
- Interferometer
- List of types of interferometers
