= Twyman–Green interferometer =

Scientific instrument for testing lenses

Figure 1. Twyman–Green Interferometer.

A Twyman–Green interferometer is a variant of the Michelson interferometer principally used to test optical components. It was introduced in 1918 by Frank Twyman and Arthur Green.

Fig. 1 illustrates a Twyman–Green interferometer set up to test a lens. Light from a laser is expanded by a diverging lens (not shown), then is collimated into a parallel beam. A convex spherical mirror is positioned so that its center of curvature coincides with the focus of the lens being tested. The emergent beam is recorded by an imaging system for analysis.

The fixed mirror in the Michelson interferometer is rotatable in the Twyman–Green interferometer, and while the light source is usually an extended source (although it can also be a laser) in a Michelson interferometer, the light source is always a point-like source in the Twyman–Green interferometer. The rotation of one mirror results in straight fringes appearing in the interference pattern, a fringing which is used to test the quality of optical components by observing changes in the fringe pattern when the component is placed in one arm of the interferometer.
