= List of types of interferometers =

An interferometer is a device for extracting information from the superposition of multiple waves.

== Field and linear interferometers ==
- Air-wedge shearing interferometer
- Astronomical interferometer / Michelson stellar interferometer
- Classical interference microscopy
- Bath interferometer (common path)
- Cyclic interferometer
- Diffraction-grating interferometer (white light)
- Double-slit interferometer
- Dual-polarization interferometry
- Fabry–Pérot interferometer
- Fizeau interferometer
- Fourier-transform interferometer
- Fresnel interferometer (e.g. Fresnel biprism, Fresnel mirror or Lloyd's mirror)
- Fringes of Equal Chromatic Order interferometer (FECO)
- Gabor hologram
- Gires–Tournois etalon
- Heterodyne interferometer (see heterodyne)
- Holographic interferometer
- Jamin interferometer
- Laser Doppler vibrometer
- Linnik interferometer (microscopy)
- LUPI variant of Michelson
- Lummer–Gehrcke interferometer
- Mach–Zehnder interferometer
- Martin–Puplett interferometer
- Michelson interferometer
- Mirau interferometer (also known as a Mirau objective) (microscopy)
- Moiré interferometer (see moiré pattern)
- Multi-beam interferometer (microscopy)
- Near-field interferometer
- Newton interferometer (see Newton's rings)
- Nomarski interferometer
- Nonlinear Michelson interferometer / Step-phase Michelson interferometer
- N-slit interferometer
- Phase-shifting interferometer (phase-shifting interferometry)
- Planar lightwave circuit interferometer (PLC)
- Photon Doppler velocimeter interferometer (PDV)
- Polarization interferometer (see also Babinet–Soleil compensator)
- Point diffraction interferometer
- Rayleigh interferometer
- Sagnac interferometer
- Schlieren interferometer (phase-shifting)
- Shearing interferometer (lateral and radial)
- Twyman–Green interferometer
- Talbot–Lau interferometer
- Watson interferometer (microscopy)
- White-light interferometer (see also Optical coherence tomography, White light interferometry, and Coherence Scanning Interferometry)
- White-light scatterplate interferometer (white-light) (microscopy)
- Young's double-slit interferometer
- Zernike phase-contrast microscopy
- ZWF interferometer (microscopy)(see https://doi.org/10.1117/1.OE.55.7.074110)

== Intensity and nonlinear interferometers ==
- intensity interferometer
- intensity optical correlator
- frequency-resolved optical gating (FROG)
- Spectral phase interferometry for direct electric-field reconstruction (SPIDER)

== Quantum optics interferometers ==
- Hong–Ou–Mandel interferometer (HOM) (see Hong–Ou–Mandel effect)
- Franson interferometer
- Hanbury Brown–Twiss interferometer (intensity interferometer)
- Polariton interferometer

== Interferometers outside optics ==
- Acoustic interferometer
- Atom interferometer
- Neutron interferometer
- Ramsey interferometer
- Mini grail interferometer
- Aharonov–Bohm effect
- Interferometric synthetic-aperture radar (a radar-based 3-d surface mapping)
- Superconducting quantum interference devices (SQUIDs)
- White–Juday warp-field interferometer

== See also ==
- Atacama Large Millimeter Array
