= Interleaving =

Interleaving may refer to:

- Interleaving, a technique for making forward error correction more robust with respect to burst errors
- An optical interleaver, a fiber-optic device to combine two sets of dense wavelength-division multiplexing (DWDM) signals
- Interleaved memory, a technique for improving the speed of access to memory
- Interleaving (data), the interspersing of fields or channels of different meaning sequentially
- Interleaving (disk storage), a technique for improving the speed of access to blocks on disk storage
- Interleaved posting, an e-mail posting style
- Interleaving (bitmaps), a technique for encoding bitmapped images
- Interleaving the bits of the binary representation of coordinate values to produce a Z-order (curve) for points
- Interleave sequence, a mathematical sequence formed by interleaving members of two other sequences in alternation
