= NGC 7094 =

Planetary nebula in the constellation Pegasus

Nebula
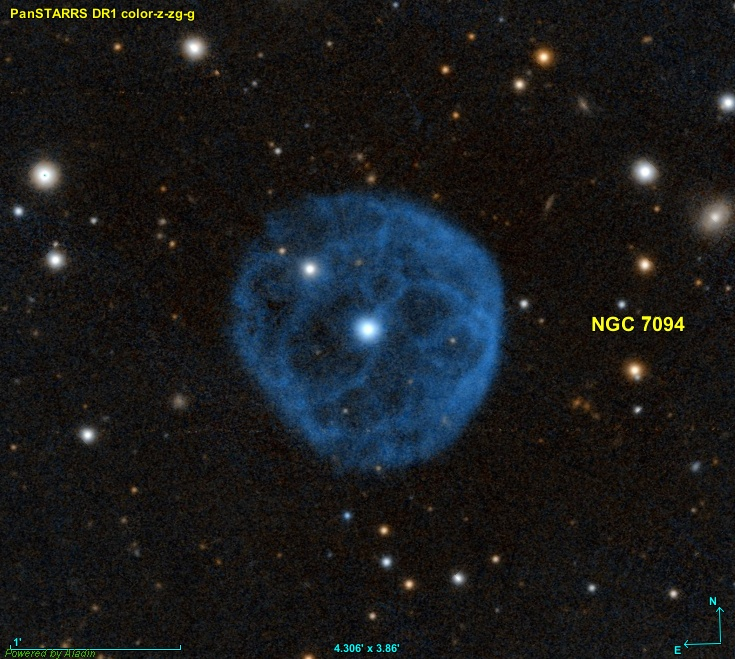
- The planetary nebula NGC 7094 as observed by the Pan-STARRS astronomical survey.

Observation data: J2000 epoch
- Right ascension: 21/36/52.970
- Declination: 12/47/19.10
- Distance: 5400 ^{+320}_{−285} ly ly (1655 ^{+97}_{−87} pc pc)
- Apparent magnitude (V): 13.4 ·
- Apparent diameter: 1.57′ ·
- Constellation: Pegasus

Physical characteristics
- Radius: 0.393 pc
- Absolute magnitude (V): 0.10 ^{+0.54}_{−0.72}
- Dimensions: 2.34 ^{+0.15}_{−0.13} ly
- Notable features
- Designations: PK 62+9.1; CS=16.0; WD 2134+125; IRAS 21344+1233; G066.7-28.2; 2MASS J21365296+1247190; WISE J213652.95+124719; Gaia DR3 1770058865674512896; NVSS J213652+124728; 2CXO J213652.9+124718

NGC 7094 is a planetary nebula located in the constellation of Pegasus. NGC 7094 was discovered by the American astronomer Lewis Swift on 10 October 1884.

== Observation ==
With an apparent visual magnitude of 13.4, a telescope with an aperture of at least 250 mm (9.8 in) is required to observe it.

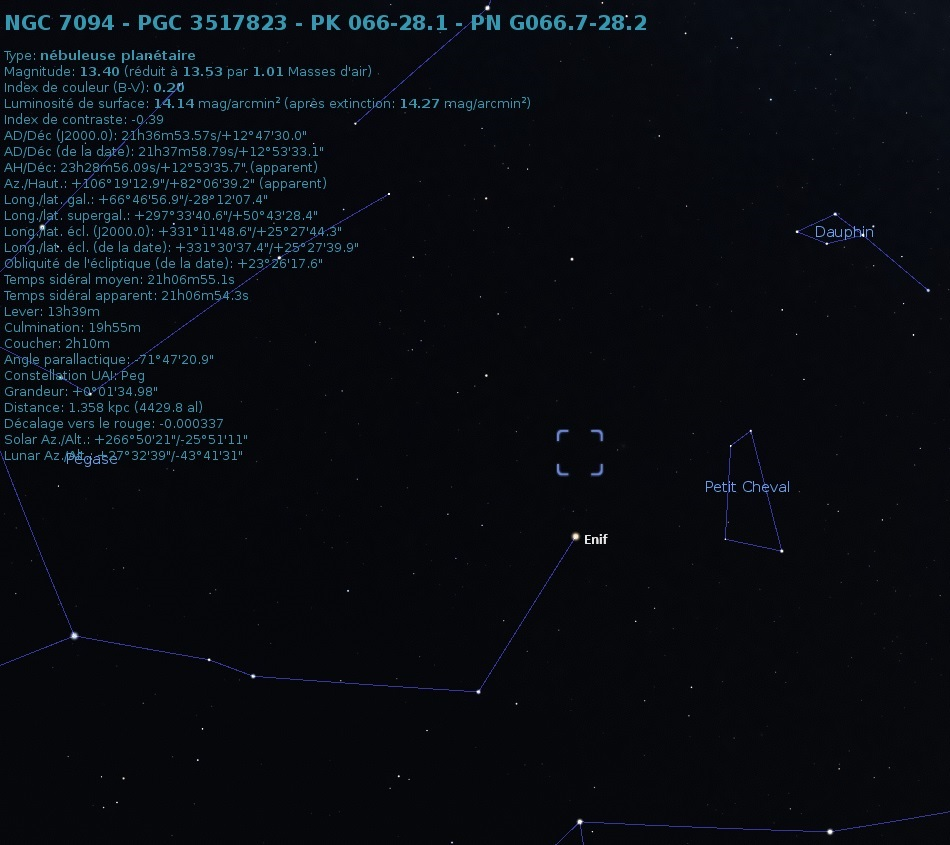
Location of NGC 7094 in the Pegasus constellation (Stellarium).

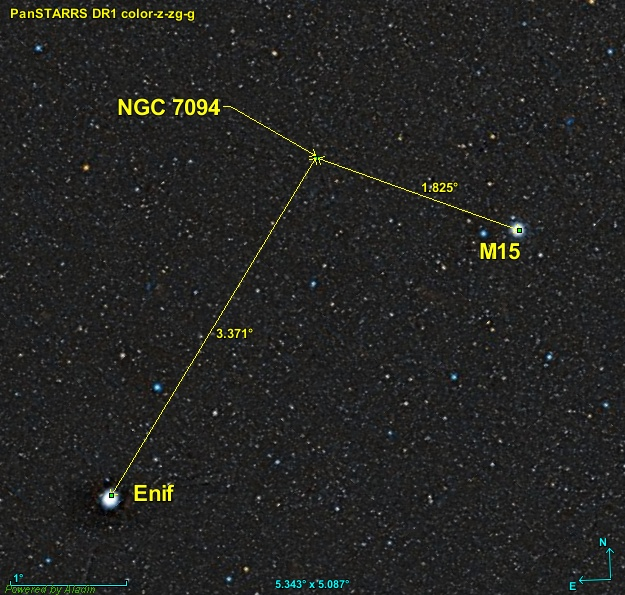
Position of NGC 7094 relative to a star in Pegasus and the globular cluster M15.

The nebula NGC 7094 is located about 3.4 degrees northwest of Enif (Epsilon Pegasi) and about 1.8 degrees northeast of the globular cluster M15.

== Characteristics ==
=== Distance, size, and velocity ===
The online software Aladin Lite can query astronomical data from several catalogs, including the "GAIA EARLY DATA RELEASE 3 (GAIA EDR3)". The parallax of NGC 7094 is 0.6042 ± 0.0336 ms (0.0006042 ± 3.36×10^{−5} s), corresponding to a distance of 1655 ^{+97}_{−87} pc.

The Simbad database lists four distance values: 1.382 ± 0.276 kpc (4.51 ± 0.90 kly), 1,655.081 ± 92.0403 pc (5,398.152 ± 300.195 ly), 1,626.2807 ± 155.2491 pc (5,304.218 ± 506.355 ly) and 1,358 pc (4,430 ly).

The apparent size of the nebula is 1.57 arcminutes, which corresponds to a physical size of 2.34 ^{+0.15}_{−0.13} ly. The nebula's radius is estimated at 0.393 pc.

Two highly uncertain velocity values are reported in Simbad: 2 ± 72 km/s (1.2 ± 44.7 mi/s) and −1 ± 34 km/s (−0.62 ± 21.13 mi/s).

=== Age ===
The age of NGC 7094 is approximately 7770 years.

== Central star ==
The central star of NGC 7094 is a PG 1159 star, which is a transitional star evolving toward a white dwarf stage.

Its visual magnitude is 13.59, with an estimated mass of 1.791 $M_{\odot}$. Its surface temperature reaches 110 kK (109,730 °C; 197,540 °F) ($Log(T_{eff}) = 5.04$) and its luminosity is 5129 $L_{\odot}$ ($Log(L/L{\odot}) = 3.71$).
