= Planar lightwave circuit interferometer =

An interferometer is an optical measuring device using the principle of light waves canceling and reinforcing each other. Interferometers are typically used to accurately measure distances. Planar lightwave circuits are either optical integrated circuits (ICs) or optical circuit boards made using the same manufacturing techniques as their electronic counterparts, using optical waveguides to route photons the same way that metal traces are used to route electrons in electronic ICs and circuit boards. A planar lightwave circuit interferometer (PLCI) is a planar lightwave circuit configured as an interferometer. PLCIs can take on any form which is rigidly printable, e.g. Mach-Zehnder, Michelson, Young's interferometer, etc. PLCIs are often found in products that are mass-produced, such as multiplexers/demultiplexers used in communications technology.

== See also ==
- List of types of interferometers
