= Optical DPSK demodulator =

An optical DPSK demodulator is a device that provides a method for converting an optical differential phase-shift keying (DPSK) signal to an intensity-keyed signal at the receiving end in fiber-optic communication networks. It is also known as delay line interferometer (DLI), or simply called DPSK demodulator.

Working principle of optical DPSK demodulation: (a) Incoming DPSK signal with uniform intensity, (b) 1-bit delay of the incoming DPSK signal with uniform intensity, and (c) Demodulated intensity signal after interference between (a)/(a′) and (b)/(b′).

The DPSK decoding method is achieved by comparing the phase of two sequential bits. An incoming DPSK optical signal is first split into two beams with equal intensities, in which one beam is delayed in space by an optical path difference that introduces a time delay corresponding to one bit. The two beams in the two paths are then coherently recombined to interfere each other constructively or destructively. The interference intensity is measured and becomes the intensity-keyed signal. A typical optical system for such a purpose is Mach–Zehnder interferometer or Michelson interferometer, forming an optical DPSK demodulator.

Delay time depends on the data rate. For instance, in a 40 Gbit/s system, one bit corresponds to 25 picoseconds, and light travels 5 mm in a fiber optics or 7.5 mm in free space within that period. Thus the optical path difference between the two beams is 5 mm or 7.5 mm depending on the type of interferometer used.

DQPSK is the four-level version of DPSK. DQPSK transmits two bits for every symbol (bit combinations being 00, 01, 11 and 10) and has an additional advantage over conventional binary DPSK. DQPSK has a narrower optical spectrum, which tolerates more dispersion (both chromatic and polarization-mode), allows for stronger optical filtering, and enables closer channel spacing. As a result, DQPSK allows processing of 40 Gbit/s data-rate in a 50 GHz channel spacing system. A demodulator for optical DQPSK signals can be constructed using two matched DPSK demodulators with phase off-set at $\pm \pi/4$.
