= Francis G. Pease =

American astronomer

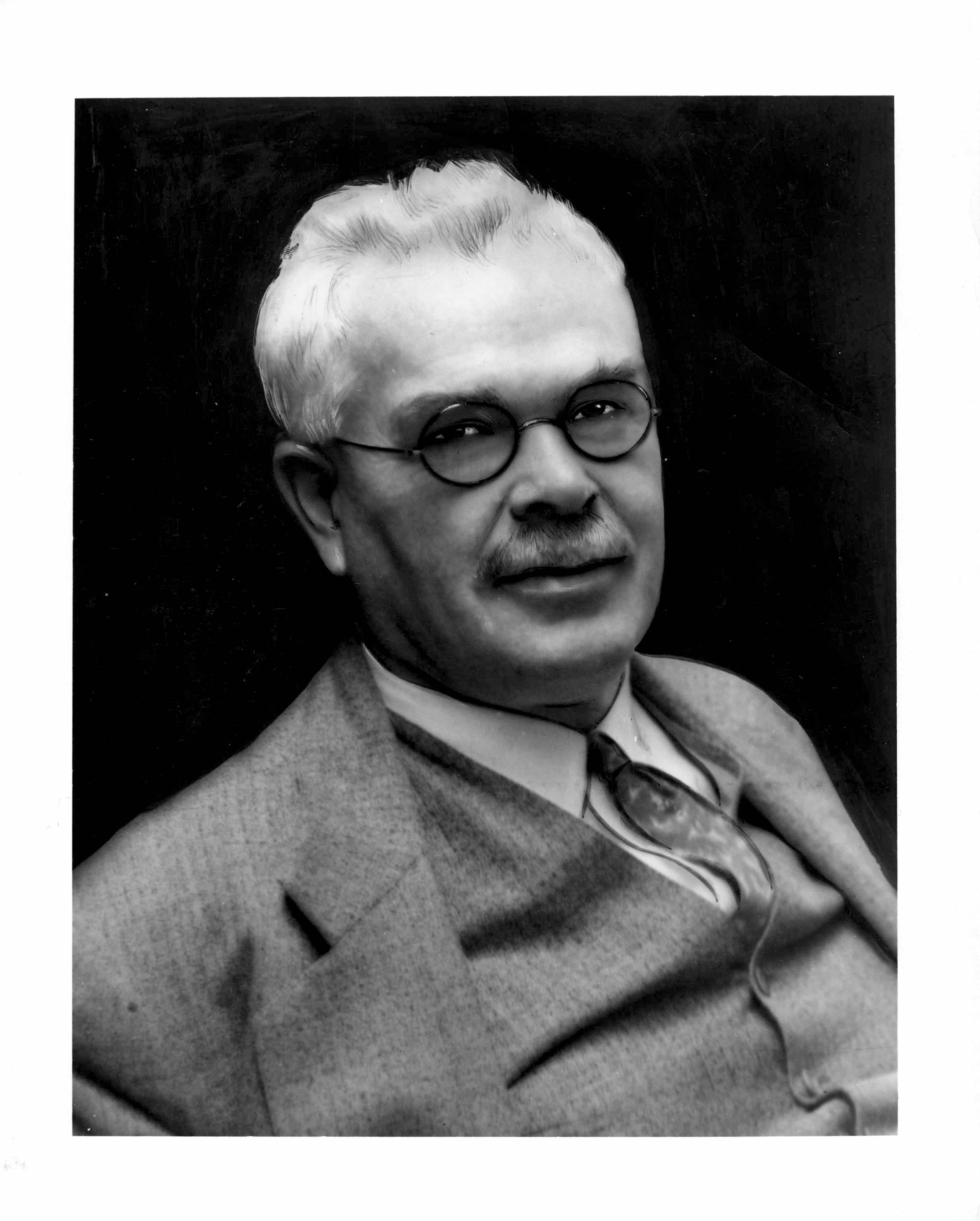
Portrait of Francis G. Pease, 1930ca.

Francis Gladheim Pease (January 14, 1881 – February 7, 1938) was an American astronomer.

He joined the Yerkes Observatory in Wisconsin, where he was an observer and an optician. There he assisted George W. Ritchey who built many of America's first large reflecting telescopes. In 1908 he became an astronomer and instrument maker at the Mount Wilson Observatory. Among his designs was the 100-inch (2,500 mm) telescope at that observatory, and a 50-foot (15 m) interferometer that he used to measure star diameters.

Gene Shoemaker used Pease's high quality photographs of the Moon to make its first geological map.

He was a longtime assistant to Albert A. Michelson. In 1920, Michelson and Pease were able to use the Michelson stellar interferometer fitted to the 100-inch (2,500 mm) telescope at Mt. Wilson to measure the angular diameter of the star Betelgeuse. Their estimate of 0.047" was very close to the value that Eddington had predicted.

He would later be involved in the design of the 200-inch (5,100 mm) Hale Telescope at the Mount Palomar Observatory. In 1928 he made the first discovery of a planetary nebula within a globular cluster, later called Pease 1.

The crater Pease on the Moon is named after him.

== See also ==
- History of astronomical interferometry
- List of astronomical instrument makers
