= Christian T. Elvey =

American astronomer and geophysicist (1899–1970)

- Born: April 1, 1899; Phoenix, Arizona Territory, U.S.
- Died: March 1, 1970 (aged 70); Tucson, Arizona
- Education: University of Kansas; University of Chicago
- Known for: Discovery with F.E. Roach of "Diffuse Galactic Light".
- Scientific career
- Fields: Astronomy, Geophysics

Christian Thomas Elvey (April 1, 1899 – March 1, 1970) was an American astronomer and geophysicist.

== Biography ==
He was born in Phoenix, Arizona to John A. and Lizzie Christina (Née Miller). As a student at the University of Kansas, he studied Astronomy and Physics, and was awarded a B.A. in 1921 then a Masters in 1923. His doctoral work in astrophysics was performed at the University of Chicago, where he was granted a Ph.D. in 1930 with a thesis concerning "the Relations Between the Observed Contours of Spectral Lines and the Physical Properties of the Stars".

Elvey worked at the Yerkes Observatory and later served as astronomer-in-charge at McDonald Observatory. His research included investigating the spectra of stars, galactic light, aurorae, and the gegenschein. During 1939–40 he worked with fellow Yerkes Observatory astronomers Otto Struve (his former teacher) and Christine Westgate to study the rate of rotation in higher mass stars via spectroscopy. During World War II, he performed applied research into rocket ballistics at the California Institute of Technology. He then joined the China Lake U. S. Naval Ordnance Test Station, becoming head of staff in 1951.

In 1952, Elvey became Director of the Geophysical Institute in Alaska, a post he would keep until 1963. He undertook a study of aurora and helped design an all-sky camera as part of the International Geophysical Year (IGY) during 1957–1958. He was instrumental in winning funding for the IGY from the National Science Foundation and served as Chairman of the Aurora and Airglow Committee at the International Union of Geodesy and Geophysics. From 1961–63 he served as the Vice President of research and advanced study at the University of Alaska. He retired in 1967, then died in Tucson, Arizona three years later. Dr. Elvey was survived by his wife Marjorie Dora née Purdy, plus their son Thomas and daughter Christina.

== Awards and honors ==
- Elected a Fellow of the American Physical Society, 1950
- Awarded an honorary Doctorate from the University of Alaska, May 19, 1969.
- Elvey crater on the far side of the Moon is named after him.
- The C. T. Elvey Building, home to the Geophysical Institute at the University of Alaska, is named after him.
