= Rayleigh interferometer =

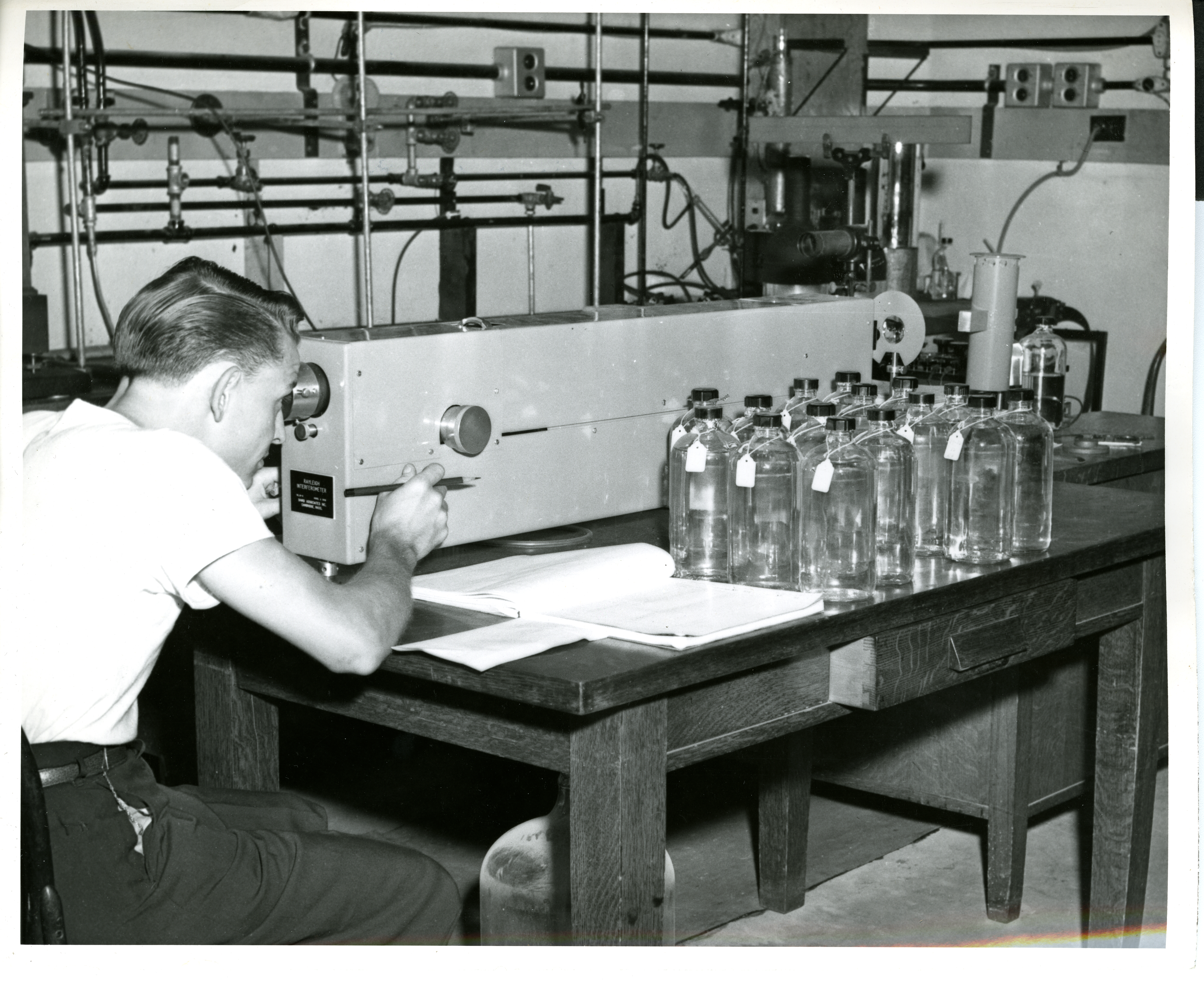
Rayleigh interferometer at the National Bureau of Standards

In optics, a Rayleigh interferometer is a type of interferometer which employs two beams of light from a single source. The two beams are recombined after traversing two optical paths, and the interference pattern after recombination allows the determination of the difference in path lengths.

== Principle of Operation ==
Collimated coherent light passing through two tubes with different refraction index gases, then an imaging lens creates the interferogram.

Light from a source (left) is collimated by a lens and split into two beams using slits. The beams are sent through two different paths and pass through compensating plates. They are brought to a focus by a second lens (bottom) where an interference pattern is observed to determine the optical path difference in terms of wavelengths of the light.

== Advantages and disadvantages ==
The advantage of the Rayleigh interferometer is its simple construction. Its drawbacks are (i) it requires a point or line source of light for good fringe visibility, and (ii) the fringes must be viewed with high magnification.

== See also ==
- List of types of interferometers
