= Optical interleaver =

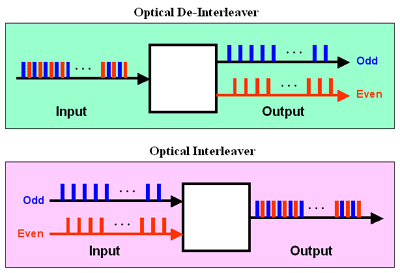
Illustration of the function of an optical interleaver and de-interleaver

An optical interleaver is a 3-port passive fiber-optic device that is used to combine (Mux) two sets of dense wavelength-division multiplexing (DWDM) channels (odd and even channels) into a composite signal stream in an interleaving way. For example, optical interleaver takes two multiplexed signals with 100 GHz spacing and interleaves them, creating a denser DWDM signal with channels spaced 50 GHz apart. The process can be repeated, creating even denser composite signals with 25 GHz or 12.5 GHz spacing.

The device can be used in a reverse direction, forming an optical deinterleaver that separates a denser DWDM signal into odd channels and even channels. See schematic diagram.

For example, in most DWDM equipment, the standard channel spacing is 100 GHz. But spacing the signal-carrying frequencies every 50 or even 25 GHz can double or even quadruple the number of channels per fiber. Thus, optical interleaver can expand the number of channels per fiber, and devices and/or networks can be upgraded without requiring that all devices be upgraded.

Optical interleaver is based on multiple-beam interference. Currently, there are two approaches to building optical interleaver: 1) Step-phase Michelson interferometer, and 2) Birefringent crystal networks. The former is based on Michelson interferometer combined with Gires-Tournois interferometer.

== See also ==
- Optical add-drop multiplexer
