= Pease 1 =

Planetary nebula

Emission nebula
- Planetary nebula
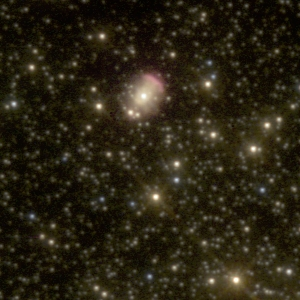

Observation data: J2000.0 epoch
- Distance: 33,600 ly
- Apparent magnitude (V): +15.5
- Apparent dimensions (V): 3 arcsecs
- Constellation: Pegasus

Physical characteristics
- Radius: 0.24 ly
- Absolute magnitude (V): -

Pease 1 is a planetary nebula located within the globular cluster M15 33,600 light-years away in the constellation Pegasus. It was the first planetary nebula known to exist within a globular cluster when it was discovered in 1928 by Francis G. Pease, and just two more have been found (in other clusters) since. At magnitude 15.5, it requires telescopes with an aperture of at least 300 millimetres (12 in) to be detected.
