= Nobel (crater) =

Crater on the Moon

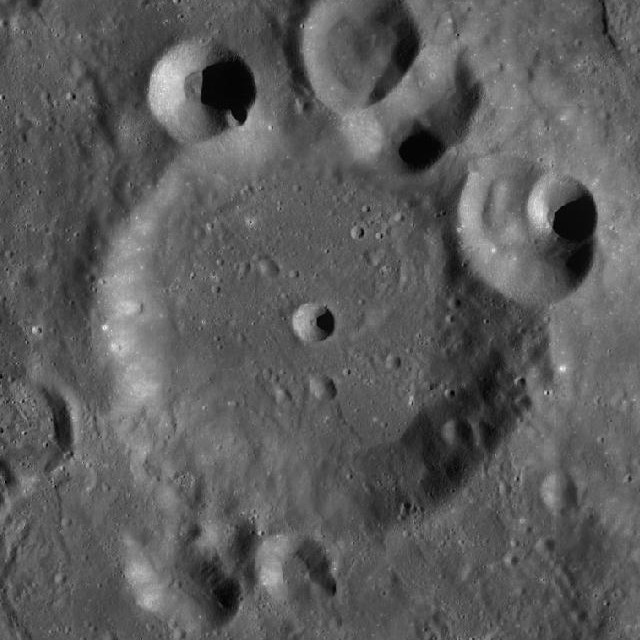
- LRO WAC image
- Coordinates: 15.0°N 101.3°W
- Diameter: 48 km
- Depth: Unknown
- Colongitude: 102° at sunrise
- Eponym: Alfred B. Nobel

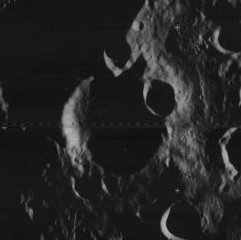
Nobel while at the lunar terminator

Nobel is a crater that lies on the far side of the Moon. It is located in the northern edge of the vast skirt of ejecta surrounding the Mare Orientale impact basin. Less than three crater diameters to the south of Nobel is the larger crater Elvey, and to the west-southwest is the smaller Pease. This is a circular, bowl-shaped crater with a worn outer rim. Three smaller craters overlie the northern rim. The interior floor is relatively level, and is marked by several small and tiny craterlets.

== Satellite craters ==
By convention these features are identified on lunar maps by placing the letter on the side of the crater midpoint that is closest to Nobel.

Nobel	Latitude	Longitude	Diameter
B	17.3° N	99.5° W	24 km
K	13.1° N	100.2° W	20 km
L	12.5° N	100.9° W	38 km
