= Elvey (crater) =

Lunar impact crater

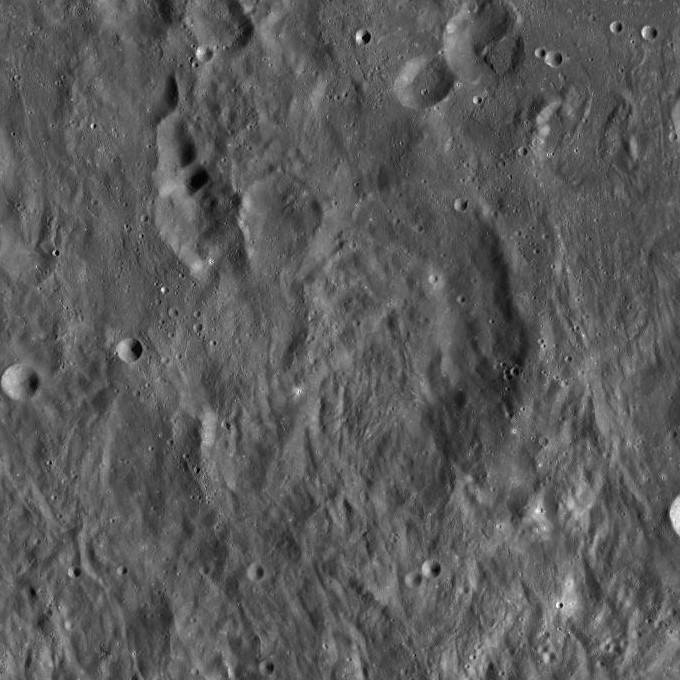
- LRO WAC image
- Coordinates: 8.8°N 100.5°W
- Diameter: 80.21 km (49.84 mi)
- Depth: Unknown
- Colongitude: 101° at sunrise
- Eponym: Christian T. Elvey

Elvey is a lunar impact crater that is located on the far side of the Moon. It is located near the northern edge of the blanket of ejecta that surrounds the Mare Orientale impact basin. To the north of Elvey is the smaller crater Nobel.

This is a damaged crater with a rim that is only partly intact along the eastern side. The remainder of the rim is irregular and less distinct. This condition may have been created by the ejecta from the Mare Orientale impact to the south. A pair of small craters lies along the northwestern rim.

This formation is named after American astronomer and geophysicist Christian Thomas Elvey (1899-1970). Its designation was officially adopted by the International Astronomical Union in 1970.

Less than two crater diameters to the south of Elvey is the impact site of a small crater named Pierazzo. This formation lies at the focus of a ray system that extends over 200 km in all directions. The central portion of this system forms a bright skirt of higher albedo material, while the rays become progressively more wispy with distance. There is a larger but less distinct ray system farther to the northwest of Elvey, and these two systems criss-cross each other along a section of terrain containing Elvey.

== Satellite craters ==
By convention these features are identified on lunar maps by placing the letter on the side of the crater midpoint that is closest to Elvey.

Elvey	Latitude	Longitude	Diameter
G	7.8° N	97.9° W	14 km
K	6.0° N	98.8° W	22 km
