= Pease (crater) =

Crater on the Moon

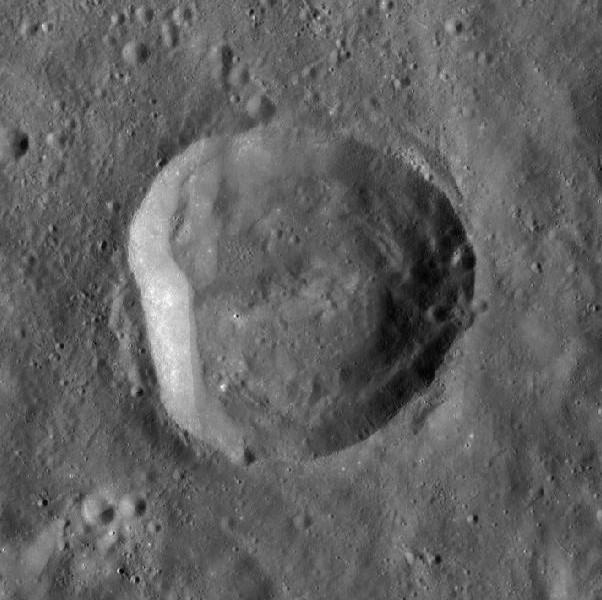
- LRO WAC image
- Coordinates: 12.5°N 106.1°W
- Diameter: 38 km
- Depth: Unknown
- Colongitude: 102° at sunrise
- Eponym: Francis G. Pease

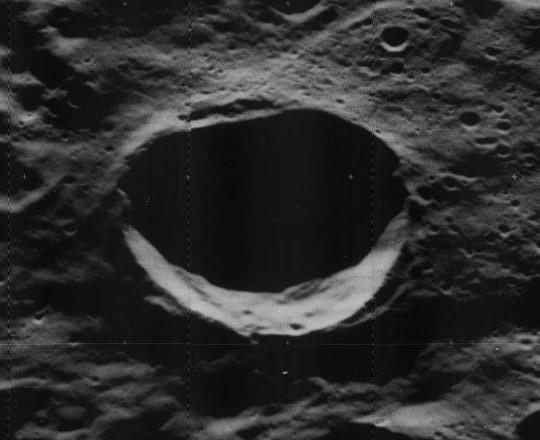
Oblique Lunar Orbiter 5 image, facing west

Pease is a lunar impact crater that lies on the far side of the Moon, in the north-northwestern edge of the huge skirt of ejecta that surrounds the Mare Orientale impact basin. It lies just over one crater diameter to the east of the smaller crater Butlerov. To the east-northeast of Pease is the somewhat larger Nobel.

It is a roughly circular, bowl-shaped formation with an outer rim that is only moderately eroded. No significant craters lie across the rim edge or the interior, and there is a slight straightening of the western rim.
