= Butlerov (crater) =

Crater on the Moon

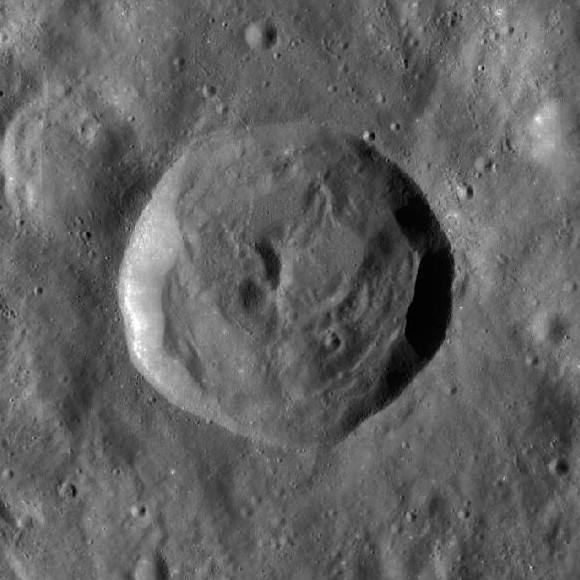
- LRO WAC image
- Coordinates: 12.5°N 108.7°W
- Diameter: 38.77 km (24.09 mi)
- Depth: Unknown
- Colongitude: 109° at sunrise
- Formation: Late Imbrian
- Eponym: Aleksandr Butlerov

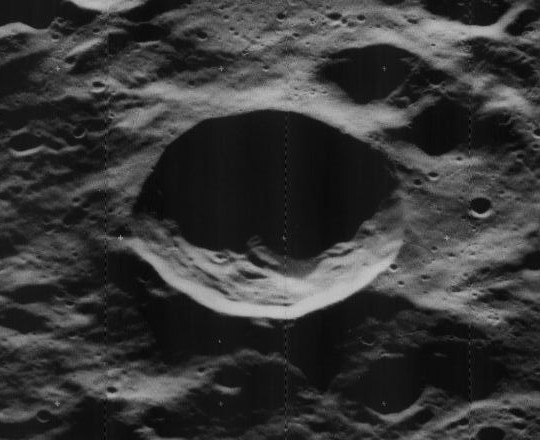
Oblique Lunar Orbiter 5 image, facing west

Butlerov is a lunar impact crater that is located on the far side of the Moon, beyond the western limb and past the area sometimes brought into view through libration. It is located one crater diameter to the west of the crater Pease. Further to the west is the larger Kolhörster.

On the lunar geologic timescale, this crater dates to the Late Imbrian period. It is a regular crater formation with a nearly circular rim that has a slight outward bulge along the southern edge. The interior is somewhat rough with a low central peak.

This formation is named after Russian chemist Aleksandr Butlerov (1828-1886). Its designation was formally adopted by the International Astronomical Union in 1970.
