= Air-wedge shearing interferometer =

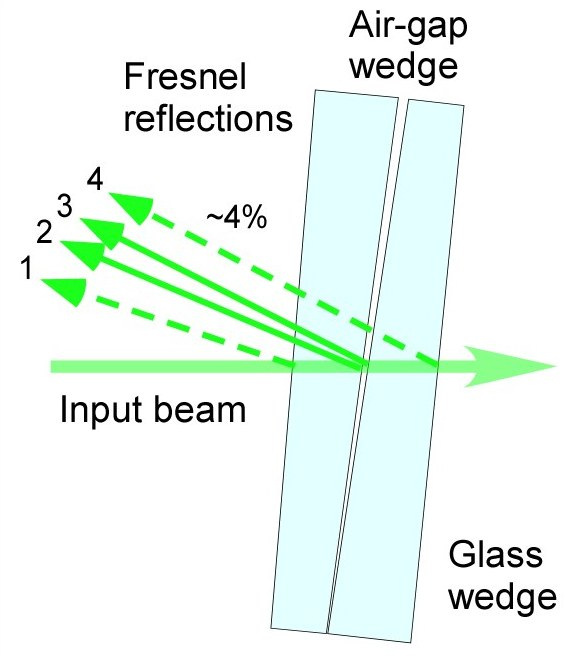
Figure 1. Beam path inside of air-wedge interferometer.

The air-wedge shearing interferometer is probably the simplest type of interferometer designed to visualize the disturbance of the wavefront after propagation through a test object. This interferometer is based on utilizing a thin wedged air-gap between two optical glass surfaces and can be used with virtually any light source even with non-coherent white light.

== Setup ==
An air-wedge shearing interferometer is described in and was employed in set of experiments described in. This interferometer consists of two optical glass wedges (~2-5deg), pushed together and then slightly separated from one side to create a thin air-gap wedge. This air-gap wedge has a unique property: it is very thin (micrometer scale) and it has perfect flatness (~λ/10).

There are four nearly equal intensity Fresnel reflections (~4% for refraction coefficient 1.5) from the air-wedge interferometer (Fig.1):

1. from the exterior surface of the first glass block
2. from the interior surface of the first glass block
3. from the interior surface of the second glass block
4. from the exterior surface of the second glass block

The angle between beams 1-2 and 3-4 is non adjustable and depends only on the shape of the glass wedge. The angle between beams 2-3 is easily adjusted by varying the air-wedge angle. The distance between the air-wedge and an image plane should be long enough to spatially separate reflections 1 from 2 and 3 from 4. The overlap of beams 2 and 3 in the image plane creates an interferogram.

== Alignment ==
To minimize image aberrations the angle plane of the glass wedges has to be placed orthogonal to the angle plane of the air-wedge. Because intensity of Fresnel reflections from a glass surface are polarization and angle dependent, it is necessary to keep the air-wedge plane nearly perpendicular to the incident beam (±5deg) to minimize instrumentally induced intensity variation. This is very important when coupling the air-wedge interferometer to imaging optics. The air-wedge interferometer has a very simple design and requiring only 2 standard BK7 glass wedges and 1 mirror holder (Fig.3).

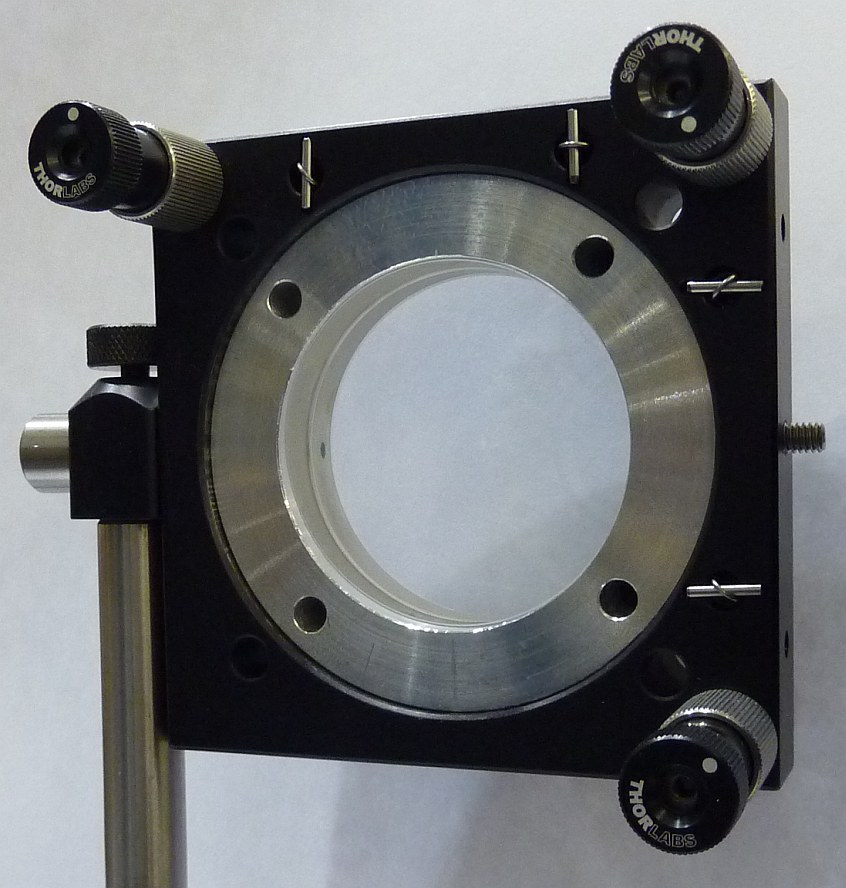
Figure 3. Example of air-wedge interferometer.

== Applications ==
Because of its extremely thin air-gap, the air-wedge interferometer was successfully applied in experiments with femto-second high-power lasers. Figure 4 shows an interferogram of laser interactions with a He jet in a vacuum chamber. The probing beam has ~500-fs duration, and ~1-μm wavelength. The air-wedge interferogram from even this very short coherence length laser beam exhibits clear, high-contrast interference lines.

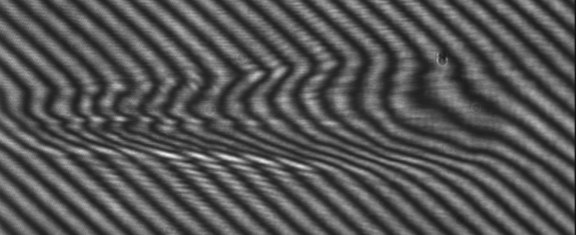
Figure 4. Interferogram of laser-He jet interaction at +15ps.

== Advantages ==
The air-wedge shearing interferometer is similar to the classical shearing interferometer but is micrometres thick, can operate with virtually any light source even with non-coherent white light, has an adjustable angular beam split, and uses standard inexpensive optical elements. Replacement of the second glass wedge by a plane-concave lens, will turn the lateral-shearing air-wedge interferometer to a radial-shearing interferometer, which is important for some specific applications.

The principle of interference from the air-wedge between two plane-parallel glass plates is described in a number of elementary optics textbooks. But this "classical" air-wedge arrangement has never been used for interferometry with field visualization owing to the overlap of all four reflected beams in the image plane. Design described in this article eliminates this obstruction and makes the air-wedge interferometer effective for practical applications with a visualization field interferometry.

== See also ==
- List of types of interferometers
- Shearing interferometer
