= Delay line interferometer =

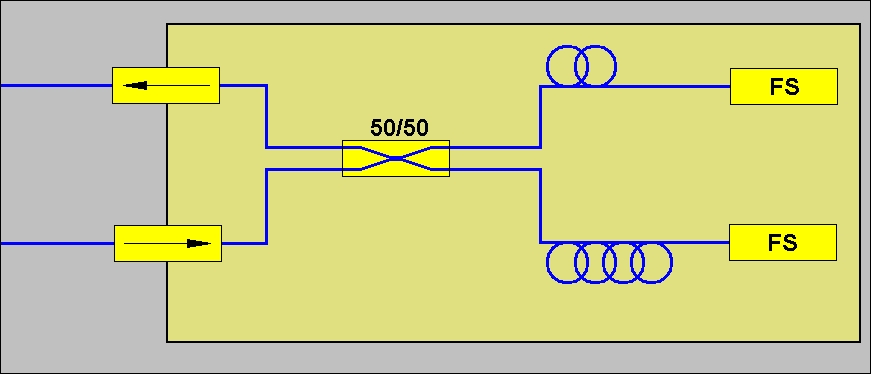

A delay line interferometer (DLI) can be a Mach–Zehnder interferometer or Michelson interferometer based on two-beam interference, in which one beam is time-delayed to the other by a desired interval.

Delay line interferometers are also known as optical DPSK demodulators. They convert a phase-keyed signal into an amplitude-keyed signal. In this application, an incoming differential phase-shift keying (DPSK) optical signal is first split into two equal-intensity beams in two arms of a Mach Zehnder or Michelson interferometer, in which one beam is delayed by an optical path difference corresponding to 1-bit time delay. After recombination, the two beams interfere with each other constructively or destructively. The resultant interference intensity is the intensity-keyed signal.
