= Michelson stellar interferometer =

Type of array used for astronomical observations

The Michelson stellar interferometer is one of the earliest astronomical interferometers built and used. The interferometer was proposed by Albert A. Michelson in 1890, following a suggestion by Hippolyte Fizeau.

The first such interferometer built was at the Mount Wilson Observatory, making use of its 100-inch (~250 centimeters) mirror. It was used to make the first-ever measurement of a stellar diameter, by Michelson and Francis G. Pease, when the diameter of Betelgeuse was measured in December 1920. The diameter was found to be 240 million miles (~380 million kilometers), about the size of the orbit of Mars, or about 300 times larger than the Sun.

Scheme of the Michelson stellar interferometer.

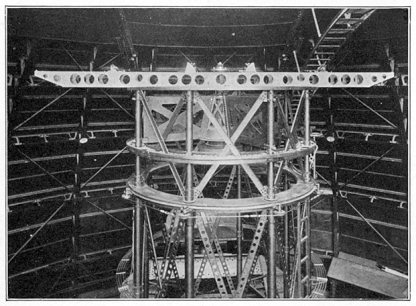
A 20-foot (~6 meters) Michelson interferometer mounted on the frame of the 100-inch (~250 cm) Hooker Telescope, 1920.

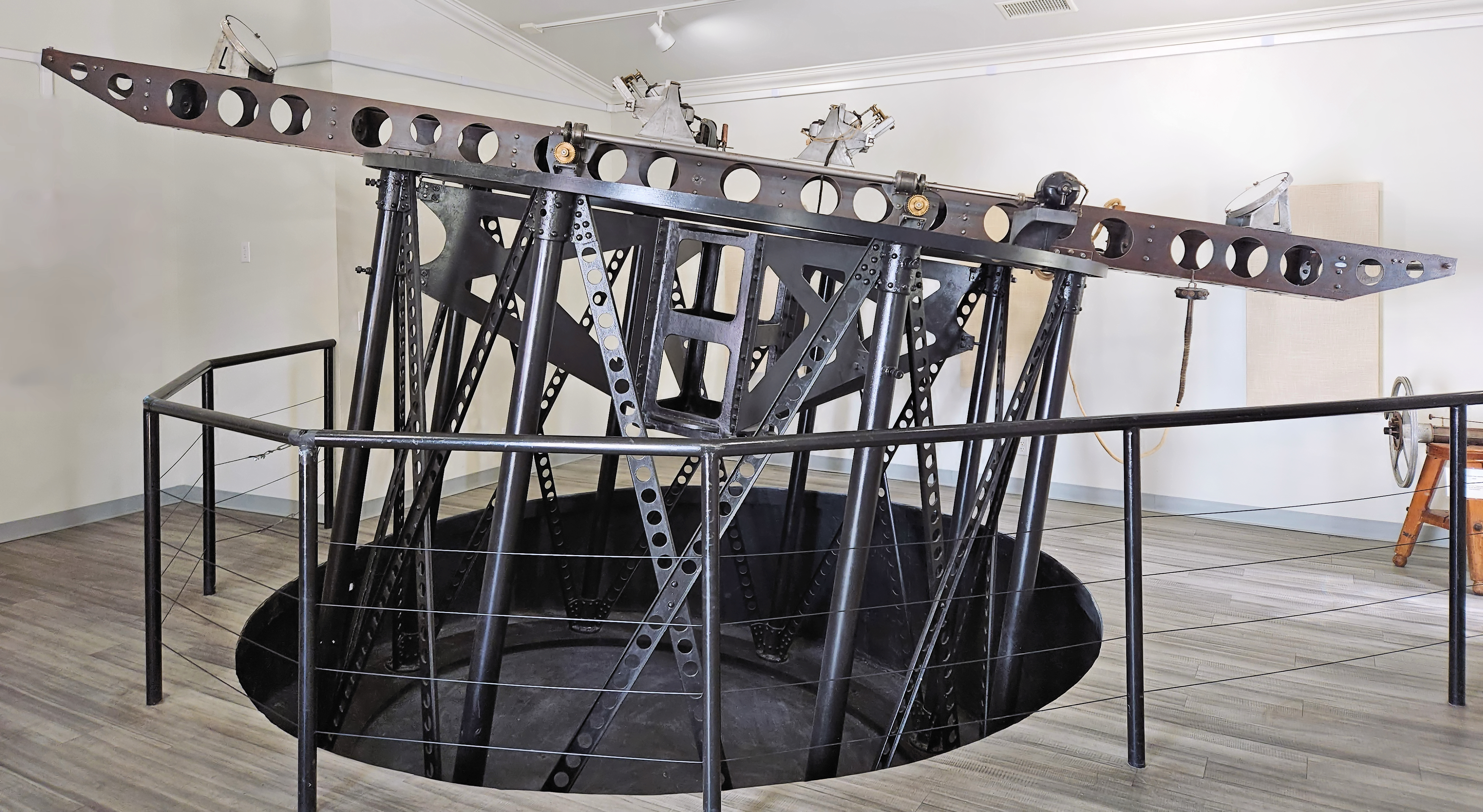
The Hooker Telescope interferometer on display at the Mount Wilson observatory, 2023.

== See also ==
- History of astronomical interferometry
- Fizeau interferometer
- Michelson interferometer
