= Martin–Puplett interferometer =

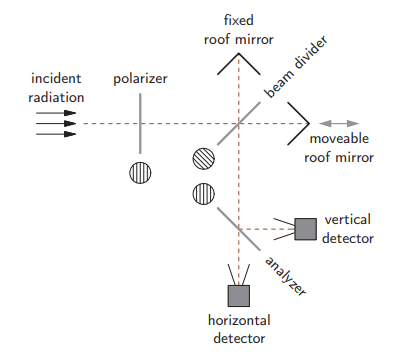
A typical Martin-Papet interferometer setup.

A Martin–Puplett interferometer measures the difference between the powers of two input beams. It is similar to a Michelson interferometer, except in a Martin Puplett interferometer the beam splitters are wire grid polarizers instead of half-silvered mirrors, and mirrors in the beam path are rooftop mirrors to flip the polarization of the light reflecting off of them by 90 degrees. Martin–Puplett interferometers are set up with two input ports and two output ports.

The configuration was proposed by Derek Martin and Edward Puplett in 1970.
