= Messier 15 =

Globular cluster in the constellation Pegasus

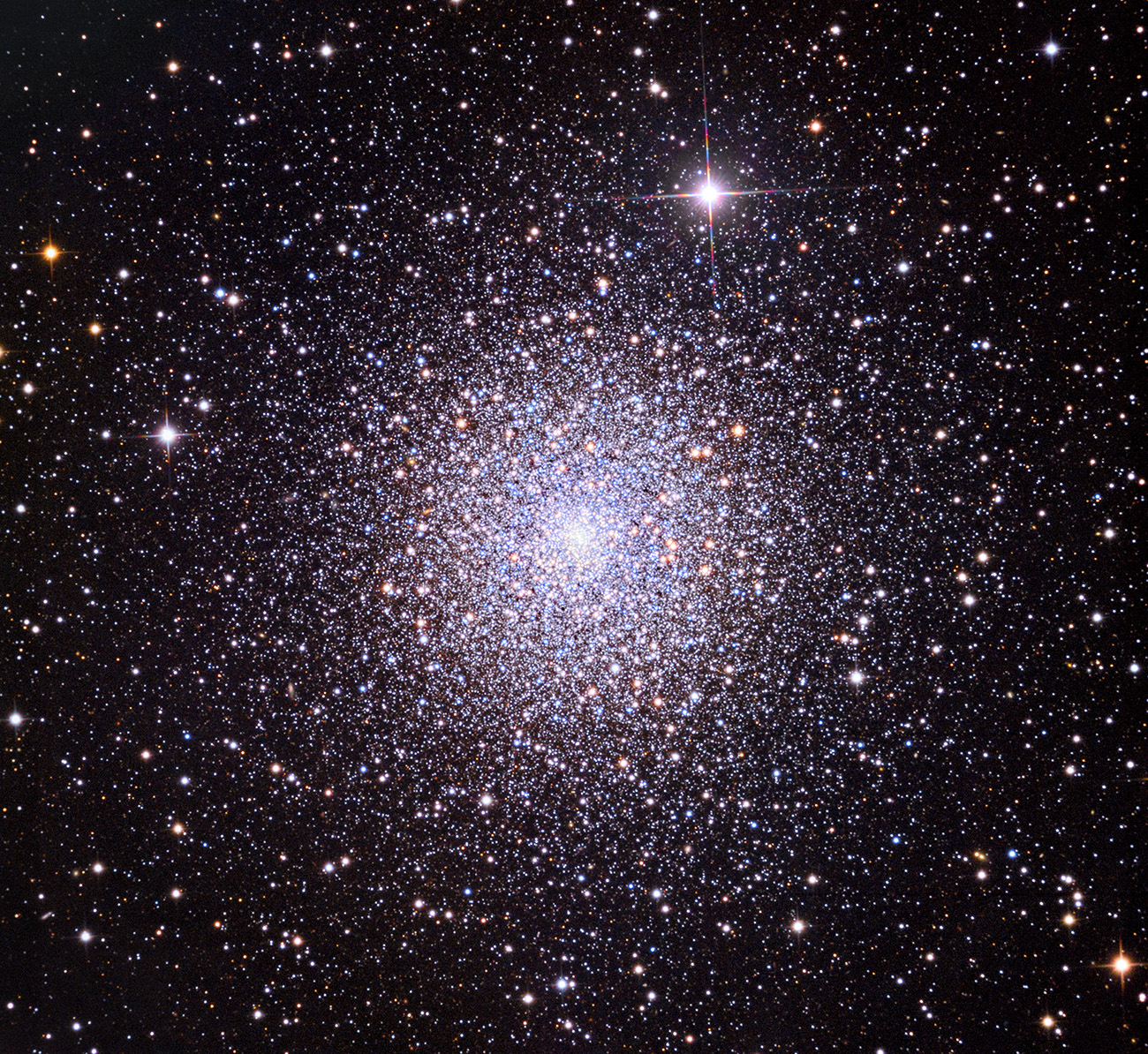
- Deep Broadband (RGB) image of M15

Observation data (J2000 epoch)
- Class: IV
- Constellation: Pegasus
- Right ascension: 21^{h} 29^{m} 58.33^{s}
- Declination: +12° 10′ 01.2″
- Distance: 35.69 ± 0.43 kly (10.944 ± 0.131 kpc)
- Apparent magnitude (V): 6.2
- Apparent dimensions (V): 18′.0

Physical characteristics
- Mass: 5.6×10^{5} M_{☉}
- Radius: ~88 ly
- V_{HB}: 15.83
- Metallicity: [Fe/H] = –2.37 dex
- Estimated age: 12.0 Gyr
- Notable features: steep central cusp
- Other designations: NGC 7078, GCl 120

Messier 15 or M15 (also designated NGC 7078 and sometimes known as the Great Pegasus Cluster) is a globular cluster in the constellation Pegasus. It was discovered by Jean-Dominique Maraldi in 1746 and included in Charles Messier's catalogue of comet-like objects in 1764. At an estimated 12.5±1.3 billion years old, it is one of the oldest known globular clusters.

== Characteristics ==
M 15 is about 35,700 light-years from Earth, and 175 light-years in diameter. It has an absolute magnitude of −9.2, which translates to a total luminosity of 360,000 times that of the Sun. Messier 15 is one of the most densely packed globulars known in the Milky Way galaxy. Its core has undergone a contraction known as "core collapse" and it has a central density cusp with an enormous number of stars surrounding what may be a central black hole.

Home to over 100,000 stars, the cluster is notable for containing a large number of variable stars (112) and pulsars (8), including one double neutron star system, M15-C. It also contains Pease 1, the first planetary nebula discovered within a globular cluster in 1928. Just three others have been found in globular clusters since then.

== Amateur astronomy ==
At magnitude 6.2, M15 approaches naked eye visibility under good conditions and can be observed with binoculars or a small telescope, appearing as a fuzzy star. Telescopes with a larger aperture (at least 6 in. (150 mm)) will start to reveal individual stars, the brightest of which are of magnitude +12.6. The cluster appears 18 arc minutes in size (three tenths of a degree across). M15 is around 4° WNW of the brightest star of Pegasus, Epsilon Pegasi.

== X-ray sources ==
Earth-orbiting satellites Uhuru and Chandra X-ray Observatory have detected two bright X-ray sources in this cluster: Messier 15 X-1 (4U 2129+12) and Messier 15 X-2. The former appears to be the first astronomical X-ray source detected in Pegasus.

== Gallery ==
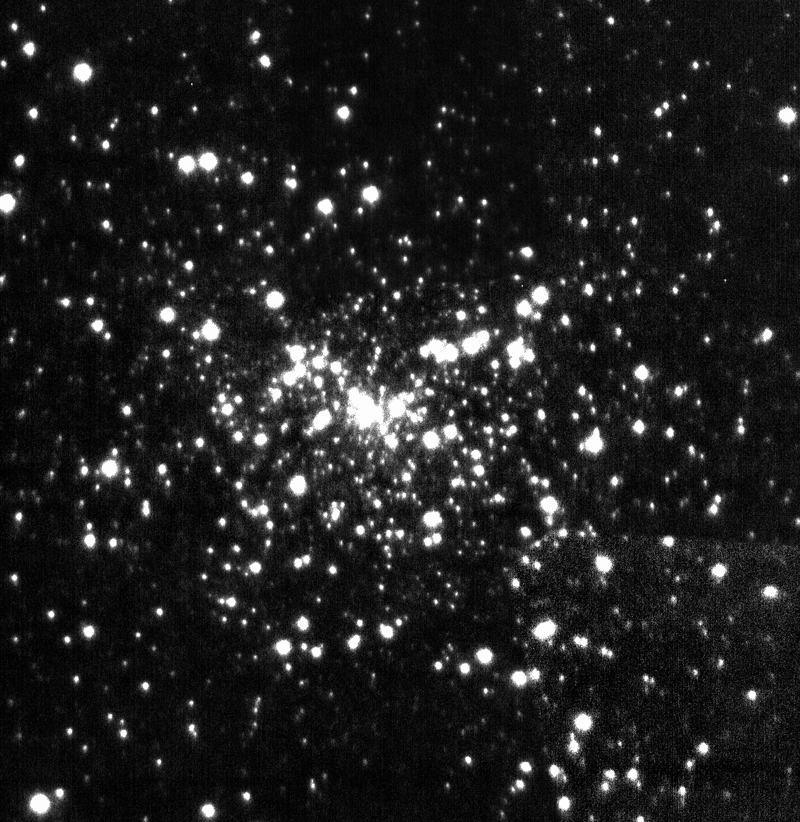
The central square arcminute of M15 imaged using the lucky imaging technique

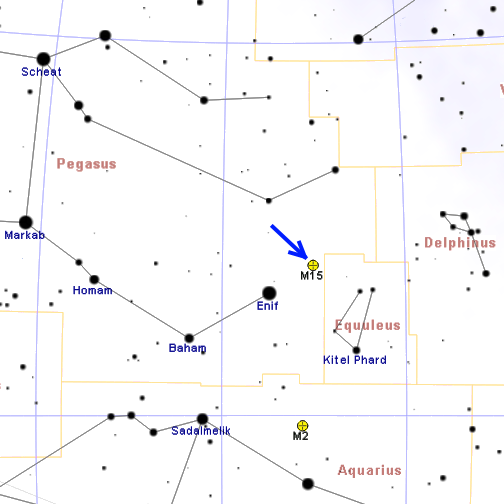
Map showing the location of M15

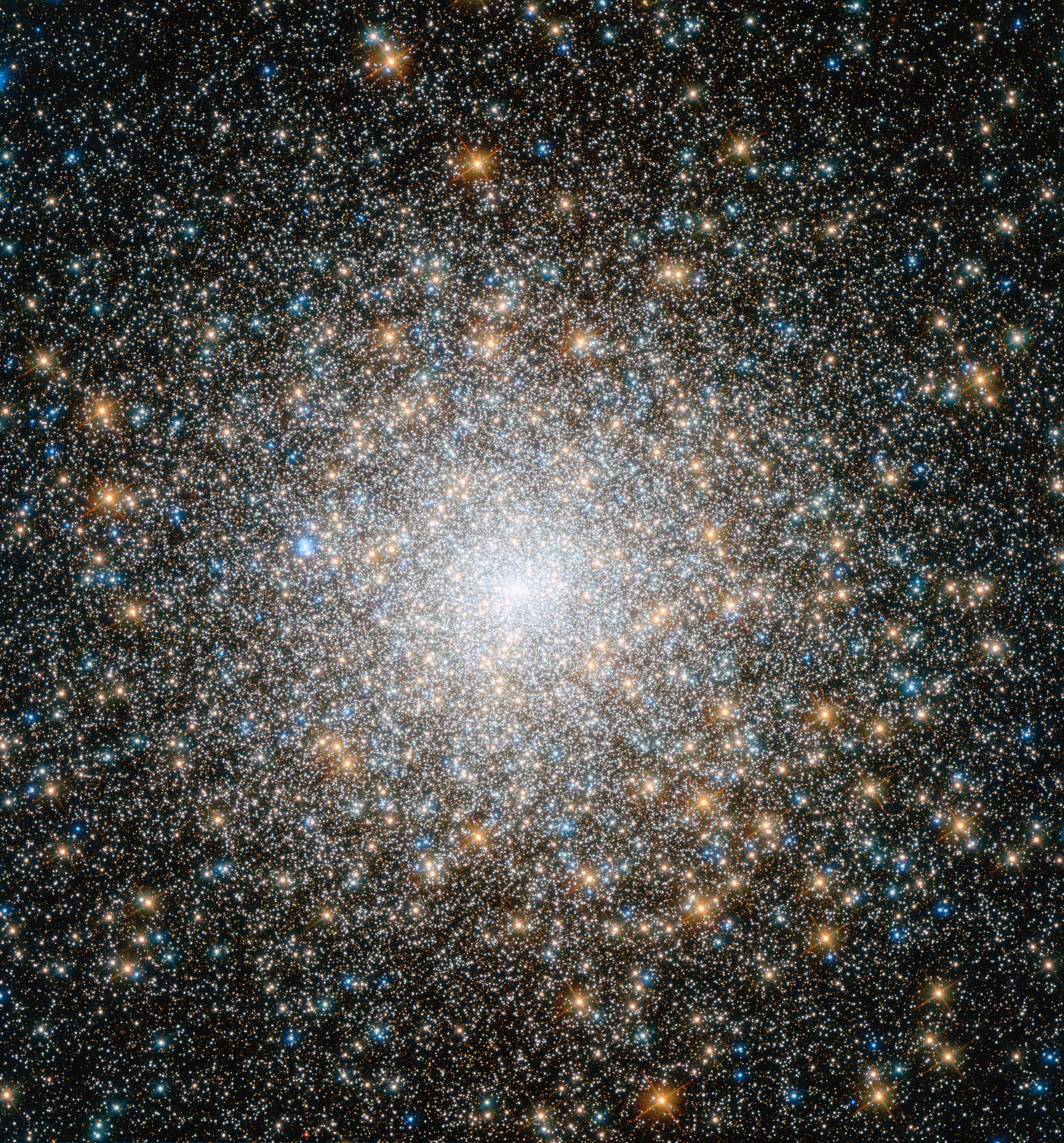
M15 photographed by HST. The planetary nebula Pease 1 can be seen as a small blue object to the upper left of the core of the cluster.

== See also ==
- List of Messier objects
- X-ray astronomy
