= Fizeau interferometer =

Interferometric arrangement

Figure 1. Fizeau interferometer

A Fizeau interferometer is an interferometric arrangement whereby two reflecting surfaces are placed facing each other. As seen in Fig 1, the rear-surface reflected light from the transparent first reflector is combined with front-surface reflected light from the second reflector to form interference fringes.

The term Fizeau interferometer also refers to an interferometric arrangement used by Hippolyte Fizeau in a famous 1851 experiment that seemingly supported the partial ether-drag hypothesis of Augustin Jean Fresnel, but which ultimately played an instrumental role in bringing about a crisis in physics that led to Einstein's development of the theory of special relativity. See Fizeau experiment.

== Applications ==
Fizeau interferometers are commonly used for measuring the shape of an optical surface: Typically, a fabricated lens or mirror is compared to a reference piece having the desired shape. In Fig. 1, the Fizeau interferometer is shown as it might be set up to test an optical flat. A precisely figured reference flat is placed on top of the flat being tested, separated by narrow spacers. The reference flat is slightly beveled (only a fraction of a degree of beveling is necessary) to prevent the rear surface of the flat from producing interference fringes. A collimated beam of monochromatic light illuminates the two flats, and a beam splitter allows the fringes to be viewed on-axis.

The reference piece is sometimes realized by a diffractive optical element (computer-generated hologram or CGH), as this can be manufactured by high accuracy lithographic methods. Fig. 2 illustrates the use of CGHs in testing. Unlike the figure, actual CGHs have line spacing on the order of 1 to 10 μm. When laser light is passed through the CGH, the zero-order diffracted beam experiences no wavefront modification. The wavefront of the first-order diffracted beam, however, is modified to match the desired shape of the test surface. In the illustrated Fizeau interferometer test setup, the zero-order diffracted beam is directed towards the spherical reference surface, and the first-order diffracted beam is directed towards the test surface in such a way that the two reflected beams combine to form interference fringes.

Figure 2. Optical testing with a Fizeau interferometer and a computer generated hologram

Fizeau interferometers are also used in fiber optic sensors for measuring pressure, temperature, strain, etc.

== Fizeau's ether-drag experiment ==
=== Significance ===
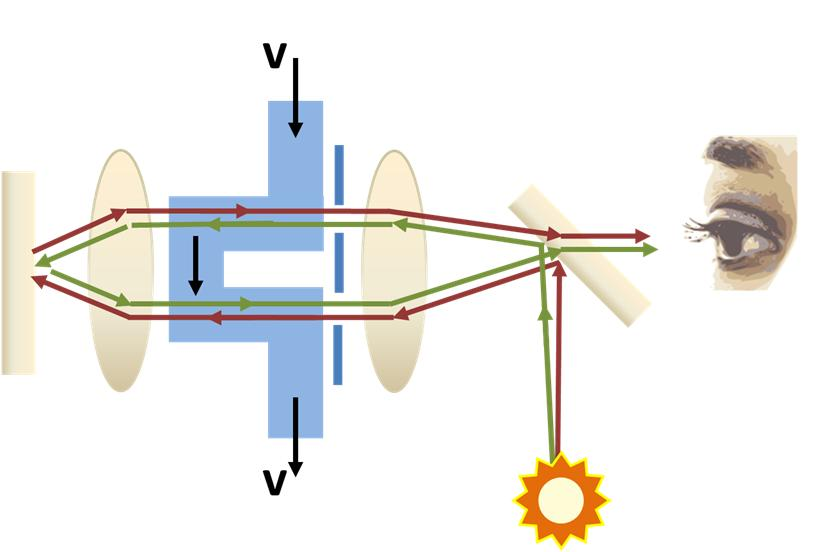
Figure 3. Fizeau interferometer for measuring the effect of water movement upon the speed of light.

In 1851, Fizeau used an entirely different form of interferometer to measure the effect of movement of a medium upon the speed of light, as seen in Fig. 3.

According to the theories prevailing at the time, light traveling through a moving medium would be dragged along by the medium, so the measured speed of the light would be a simple sum of its speed through the medium plus the speed of the medium.

Fizeau indeed detected a dragging effect, but the magnitude of the effect that he observed was far lower than expected. His results seemingly supported the partial ether-drag hypothesis of Fresnel, a situation that was disconcerting to most physicists.

Over half a century passed before a satisfactory explanation of Fizeau's unexpected measurement was developed with the advent of Einstein's theory of special relativity.

=== Experimental setup ===
Light reflected from the tilted beam splitter is made parallel using a lens and split by slits into two beams, which traverse a tube carrying water moving with velocity v. Each beam travels a different leg of the tube, is reflected at the mirror at left, and returns through the opposite leg of the tube. Thus, both beams travel the same path, but one in the direction of flow of the water, and the other opposing the flow. The two beams are recombined at the detector, forming an interference pattern that depends upon any difference in time traveling the two paths.

The interference pattern can be analyzed to determine the speed of light traveling along each leg of the tube.

== See also ==
- Hippolyte Fizeau
- List of types of interferometers
