= Bath interferometer (common path) =

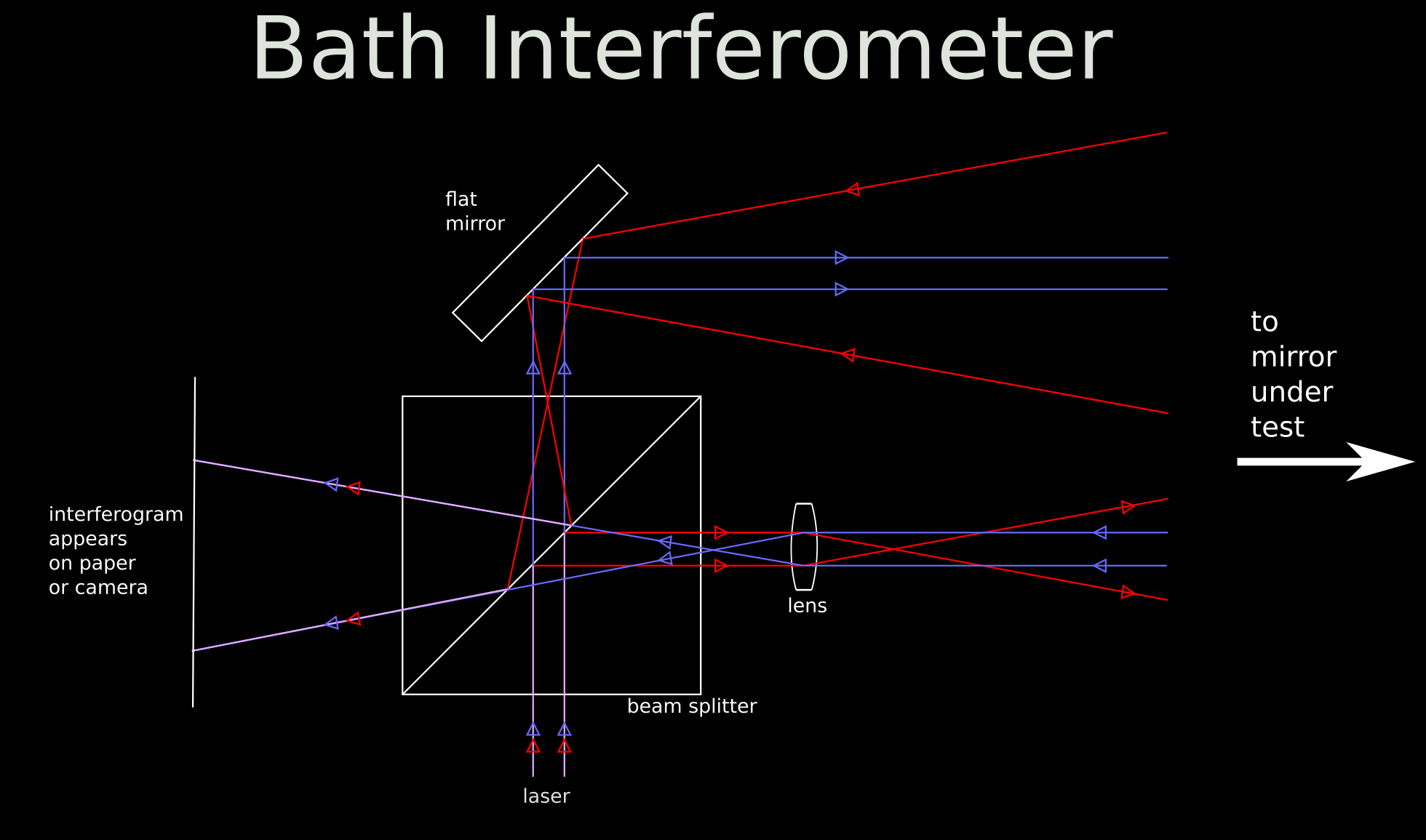
"Right Angle Bath" interferometer diagram

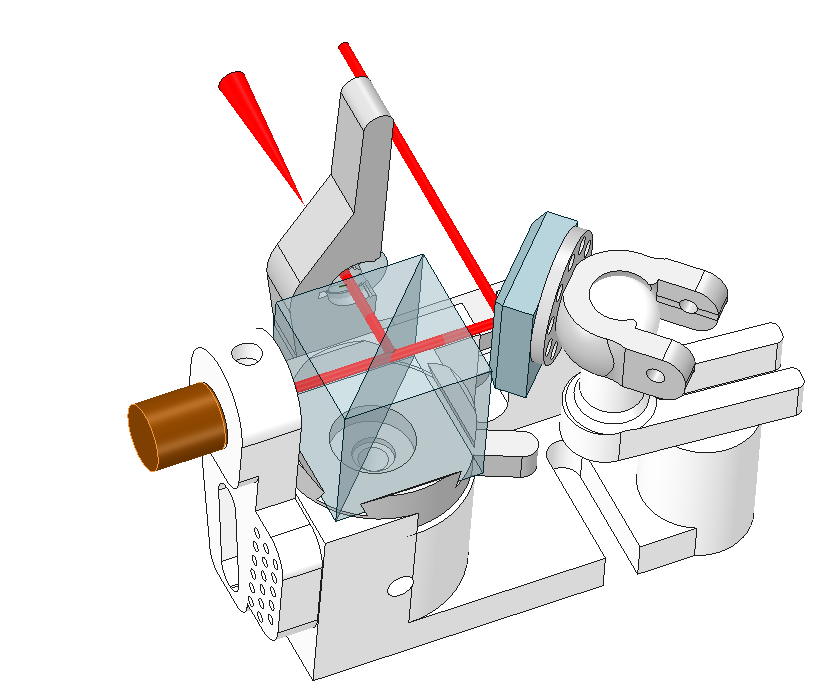
"Right Angle Bath" interferometer CAD model example

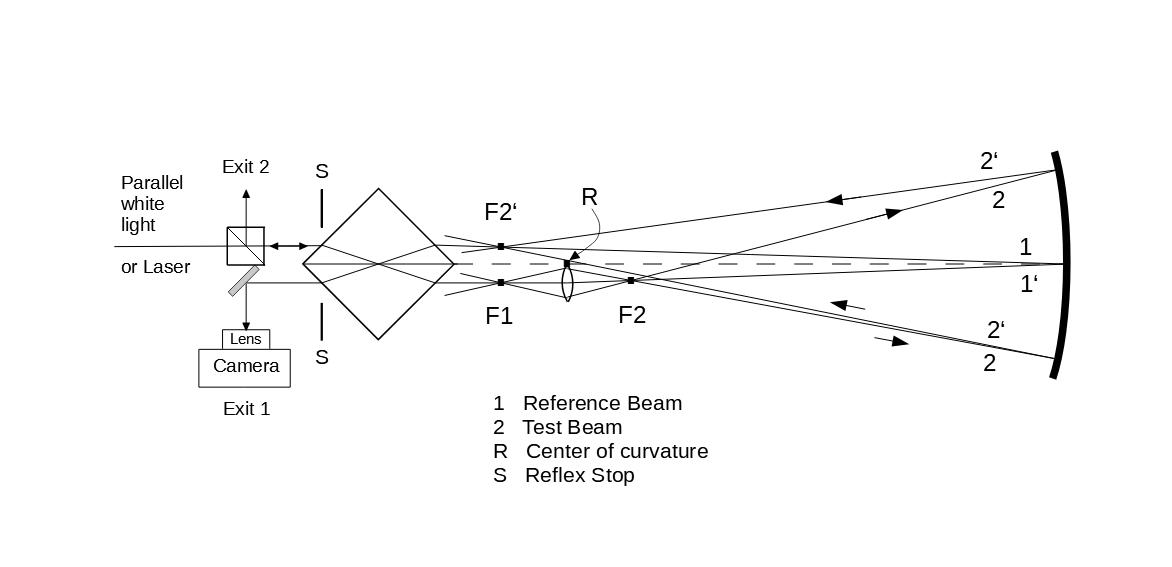
Karl-Ludwig's preferred version of the Bath. This newer drawing is almost identical to original patent drawing.

Karl-Ludwig Bath patented 5 designs of common path interferometers in 1973. Bath interferometers can be used to test telescope mirrors of any size.

A Common path interferometer has the test and reference beams traveling over effectively the same path which has the advantage that you can use an inexpensive semiconducting laser pointer with low coherence versus other interferometers which need a high coherence laser (typically a He Ne laser).

Bath also published an article about his favorite variation in June of 1973.

Before the patent there was a functionally identical Right Angle Bath interferometer described and published in the journal Optical Engineering (the article was received by the journal on July 23, 1973).
