= Gires–Tournois etalon =

Optical interferometer

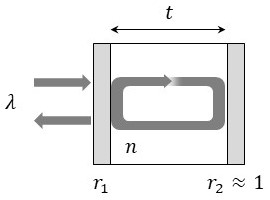
Schematic of a Gires-Tournois etalon when light impinges at normal incidence on the first reflecting plate.

In optics, a Gires–Tournois etalon (also known as Gires–Tournois interferometer) is a transparent plate with two reflecting surfaces, one of which has very high reflectivity, ideally unity. Due to multiple-beam interference, light incident on a Gires–Tournois etalon is (almost) completely reflected, but has an effective phase shift that depends strongly on the wavelength of the light.

The complex amplitude reflectivity of a Gires–Tournois etalon is given by

$$r=-\frac{r_1-e^{-i\delta}}{1-r_1 e^{-i\delta}}$$

where:

- r_{1} is the complex amplitude reflectivity of the first surface,
- $\delta=\frac{4 \pi}{\lambda} n t \cos \theta_t$,
- n is the index of refraction of the plate,
- t is the thickness of the plate,
- θ_{t} is the angle of refraction the light makes within the plate, and
- λ is the wavelength of the light in vacuum.

== Nonlinear effective phase shift ==
Nonlinear phase shift Φ as a function of δ for R = 0, 0.1, 0.5, and 0.9

Suppose that $r_1$ is real. Then $|r| = 1$, independent of $\delta$. This indicates that all the incident energy is reflected and intensity is uniform. However, the multiple reflection causes a nonlinear phase shift $\Phi$.

To show this effect, we assume $r_1$ is real and $r_1=\sqrt{R}$, where $R$ is the intensity reflectivity of the first surface. Define the effective phase shift $\Phi$ through

$$r=e^{i\Phi}.$$

One obtains

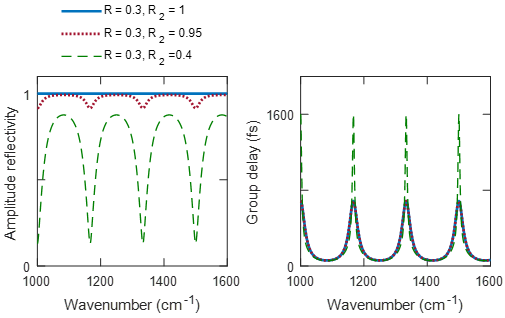
Amplitude reflectivity and group delay induced by a Gires-Tournois interferometer with the intensity reflectivity of the first surface being $R= 0.3$ and that of the second surface being $R_2=1$, i.e. as for a perfect reflector (blue line). In this case the amplitude reflectivity is unity for all frequencies and the resonant behavior of the interferometer is observed only in the imparted group delay. As $R_2$ becomes smaller than 1 (red and green lines), for instance due to losses at the reflector, the Gires-Tournois interferometer starts behaving as a Fabry-Pérot etalon. Other parameters of the calculation are $t=30\ \text{μm}$, $n=1$ and $\theta_t=0$.

$$\tan\left(\frac{\Phi}{2}\right)=-\frac{1+\sqrt{R}}{1-\sqrt{R}}\tan\left(\frac{\delta}{2}\right)$$

For R = 0, no reflection from the first surface and the resultant nonlinear phase shift is equal to the round-trip phase change ($\Phi = \delta$) – linear response. However, as can be seen, when R is increased, the nonlinear phase shift $\Phi$ gives the nonlinear response to $\delta$ and shows step-like behavior. Gires–Tournois etalon has applications for laser pulse compression and nonlinear Michelson interferometer.

Gires–Tournois etalons are closely related to Fabry–Pérot etalons. This can be seen by examining the total reflectivity of a Gires–Tournois etalon when the reflectivity of its second surface becomes smaller than 1. In these conditions the property $|r| = 1$ is not observed anymore: the reflectivity starts exhibiting a resonant behavior which is characteristic of Fabry-Pérot etalons.
