= Calandrelli =

Calandrelli is a surname. Notable people with the surname include:

- Alexander Calandrelli (1834–1903), German sculptor of Italian descent
- Andrew Calandrelli, American mixed martial artist
- Emily Calandrelli, American science communicator
- Giuseppe Calandrelli (1749–1827), Italian priest and astronomer
- Ignazio Calandrelli (1792–1866), Italian priest and astronomer (nephew of Giuseppe)
- Jorge Calandrelli (1939–2026), Argentine composer, arranger and conductor
- Susana Calandrelli (1901–1978), Argentine writer and teacher
