= Vega =

Brightest star in the constellation Lyra

- Location of Vega (circled)

Observation data Epoch J2000.0 Equinox ICRS
- Constellation: Lyra
- Pronunciation: /ˈviːɡə/ or /ˈveɪɡə/
- Right ascension: 18^{h} 36^{m} 56.33635^{s}
- Declination: +38° 47′ 01.2802″
- Apparent magnitude (V): +0.026 (−0.02 – +0.07)

Characteristics
- Evolutionary stage: Main sequence
- Spectral type: A0Va
- U−B color index: 0.00
- B−V color index: 0.00
- Variable type: Delta Scuti

Astrometry
Radial velocity (R_{v})	−13.9±0.9 km/s
Proper motion (μ)	RA: 200.94 mas/yr Dec.: 286.23 mas/yr
Parallax (π)	130.23±0.36 mas
Distance	25.04 ± 0.07 ly (7.68 ± 0.02 pc)
Absolute magnitude (M_{V})	+0.582

Details
Mass	2.15+0.10 −0.15 M_{☉}
Radius	2.726±0.006 (equatorial), 2.418±0.008 (polar) R_{☉}
Luminosity	47.2±0.2 L_{☉}
Surface gravity (log g)	4.1±0.1 cgs
Temperature	10,070±90 (polar), 8,910±130 (equatorial) K
Metallicity [Fe/H]	−0.5 dex
Rotation	16.3 h
Rotational velocity (v sin i)	21.3±0.2 km/s
Age	700+150 −75 Myr

Other designations
- Wega, Lucida Lyrae, Alpha Lyrae, α Lyrae, 3 Lyrae, BD+38°3238, GJ 721, HD 172167, HIP 91262, HR 7001, SAO 67174, LTT 15486

Database references
SIMBAD	data

Vega is the brightest star in the northern constellation of Lyra. It has the Bayer designation α Lyrae, which is Latinised to Alpha Lyrae and abbreviated Alpha Lyr or α Lyr. This star is relatively close to the Solar System, at only 25 light-years (7.7 parsecs) from the Sun, and one of the most luminous stars in the Sun's neighborhood, being intrinsically brighter than any star nearer to the Sun. It is the fifth-brightest star in the night sky, and the second-brightest star in the northern celestial hemisphere, after Arcturus.

Vega has been extensively studied by astronomers, leading it to be termed "arguably the next most important star in the sky after the Sun". Vega was the northern pole star around 12000 BCE and will be so again around the year 13724, when its declination will be +84° 14′, less than six degrees from the Pole. Vega was the first star other than the Sun to have its image and spectrum photographed. It was one of the first stars whose distance was estimated through parallax measurements. Vega has functioned as the baseline for calibrating the photometric brightness scale and was one of the stars used to define the zero point for the UBV photometric system.

Vega is only about a tenth of the age of the Sun, but since it is 2.1 times as massive, its expected lifetime is also one tenth of that of the Sun; both stars are at present approaching the midpoint of their main sequence lifetimes. Compared with the Sun, Vega has a lower abundance of elements heavier than helium. Vega is also a variable star—that is, a star whose brightness fluctuates. It is rotating rapidly with a speed of 236 km/s at the equator. This causes the equator to bulge outward due to centrifugal effects, and, as a result, there is a variation of temperature across the star's photosphere that reaches a maximum at the poles. From Earth, Vega is observed from the direction of one of these poles.

Based on observations of more infrared radiation than expected, Vega appears to have a circumstellar disk of dust. This dust is likely to be the result of collisions between objects in an orbiting debris disk, which is analogous to the Kuiper belt in the Solar System. Stars that display an infrared excess due to dust emission are termed Vega-like stars. Observations by the James Webb Space Telescope show that the disk is exceptionally smooth, with no evidence of shaping by massive planets, though there is some evidence that there may be one or more Neptune-mass planets closer to the star.

== Nomenclature ==
α Lyrae (Latinised to Alpha Lyrae) is the star's Bayer designation. The traditional name Vega (earlier Wega) comes from a loose transliteration of the Arabic word wāqi' (Arabic: واقع) meaning "falling" or "landing", via the phrase an-nasr al-wāqi' (Arabic: النّسر الْواقع), "the falling eagle". In 2016, the International Astronomical Union (IAU) organized a Working Group on Star Names (WGSN) to catalog and standardize proper names for stars. The WGSN's first bulletin of July 2016 included a table of the first two batches of names approved by the WGSN; which included Vega for this star. It is now so entered in the IAU Catalog of Star Names.

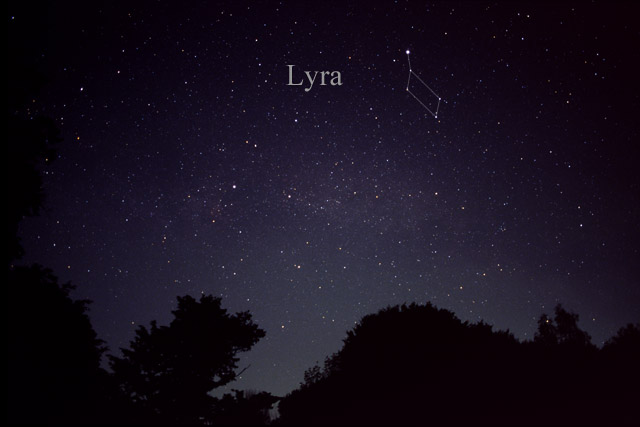
Vega is the brightest star in the constellation of Lyra.

== Observation ==
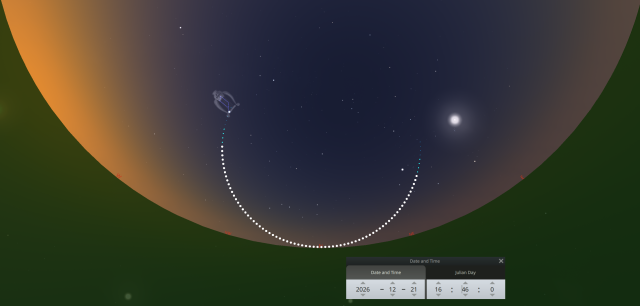
Path of Vega over winter solstice, as seen from 51° N

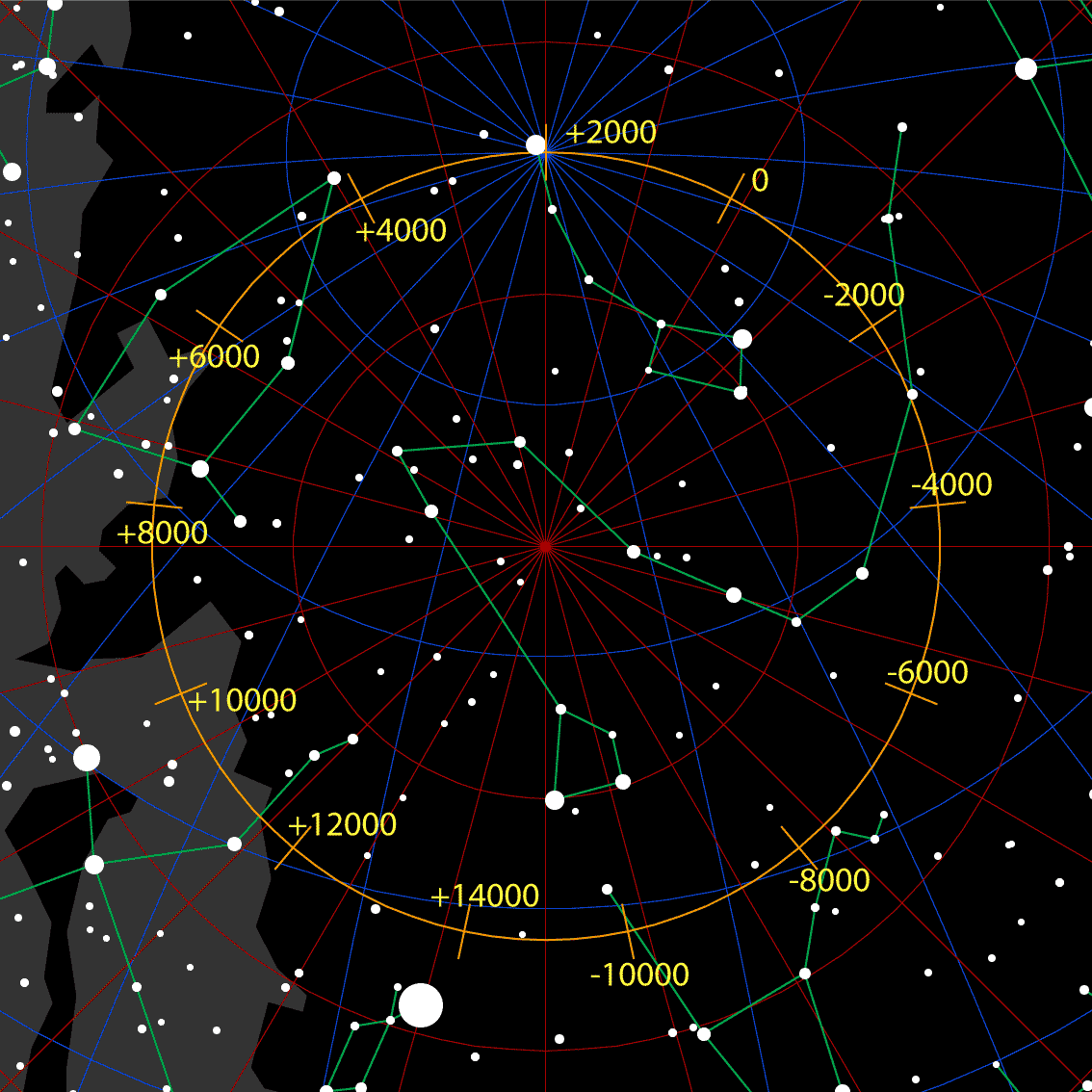
Due to axial precession, the north celestial pole changes over a cycle of about 26,000 years. Vega is the bright star near the bottom.

Vega can often be seen near the zenith in the mid-northern latitudes during the evening in the Northern Hemisphere summer. From mid-southern latitudes, it can be seen low above the northern horizon during the Southern Hemisphere winter. With a declination of +38.78°, Vega can only be viewed at latitudes north of 51° S (51° being its approximate distance from the north celestial pole. Therefore, it does not rise at all anywhere in Antarctica or in the southernmost part of South America, including Punta Arenas, Chile (53° S). At latitudes to the north of 51° N, Vega remains continuously above the horizon as a circumpolar star; around July 1, Vega reaches midnight culmination when it crosses the meridian at that time. Complementarily, from 51° N, Vega swoops down and kisses the horizon at true North at midnight around winter solstice.

Each night the positions of the stars appear to change as the Earth rotates. However, when a star is located along the Earth's axis of rotation, it will remain in the same position and thus is called a pole star. The direction of the Earth's axis of rotation gradually changes over time in a process known as the precession of the equinoxes. A complete precession cycle requires 25,770 years, during which time the pole of the Earth's rotation follows a circular path across the celestial sphere that passes near several prominent stars. At present the pole star is Polaris, but around 12,000 BCE the pole was pointed only 4.5 degrees away from Vega. Through precession, the pole will again pass near Vega around 14,000 CE. Vega is the brightest of the successive northern pole stars. In 210,000 years, Vega will become the brightest star in the night sky, and will peak in brightness in 290,000 years with an apparent magnitude of –0.81.

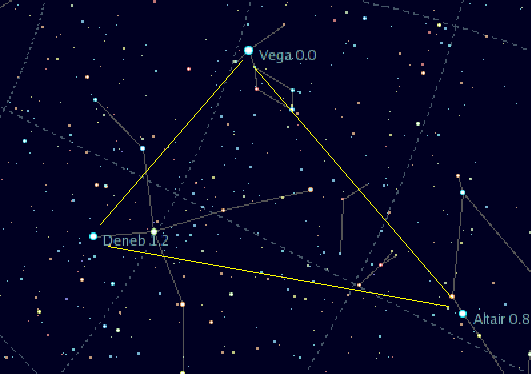
Vega (top) in the Summer Triangle

This star lies at a vertex of a widely spaced asterism called the Summer Triangle, which consists of Vega plus the two first-magnitude stars Altair, in Aquila, and Deneb in Cygnus. This formation is the approximate shape of a right triangle, with Vega located at its right angle. The Summer Triangle is recognizable in the northern skies because there are few other bright stars in its vicinity.

== Observational history ==
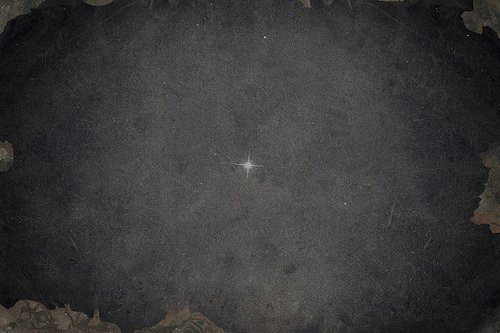
"On the night of July 16–17, 1850, Whipple and Bond made the first daguerreotype of a star (Vega)"

Astrophotography, the photography of celestial objects, began in 1840 when John William Draper captured an image of the Moon using the daguerreotype process. On 17 July 1850, Vega became the first star (other than the Sun) to be photographed, when it was imaged by William Bond and John Adams Whipple at the Harvard College Observatory, also with a daguerreotype. In August 1872, Henry Draper took a photograph of Vega's spectrum, the first photograph of a star's spectrum showing absorption lines. Similar lines had already been identified in the spectrum of the Sun. In 1879, William Huggins used photographs of the spectra of Vega and similar stars to identify a set of twelve "very strong lines" that were common to this stellar category. These were later identified as lines from the Hydrogen Balmer series. Since 1943, the spectrum of this star has served as one of the stable anchor points by which other stars are classified.

The distance to Vega can be determined by measuring its parallax shift against the background stars as the Earth orbits the Sun. Giuseppe Calandrelli noted stellar parallax in 1805-6 and came up with a 4-second value for the star which was a gross overestimate. The first person to publish a star's parallax was Friedrich G. W. von Struve, when he announced a value of 0.125 arcsecond (0.125″) for Vega. Friedrich Bessel was skeptical about Struve's data, and, when Bessel published a parallax of 0.314″ for the star system 61 Cygni, Struve revised his value for Vega's parallax to nearly double the original estimate. This change cast further doubt on Struve's data. Thus most astronomers at the time, including Struve, credited Bessel with the first published parallax result. However, Struve's initial result was actually close to the currently accepted value of 0.129″, as determined by the Hipparcos astrometry satellite.

The brightness of a star, as seen from Earth, is measured with a standardized, logarithmic scale. This apparent magnitude is a numerical value that decreases in value with increasing brightness of the star. The faintest stars visible to the unaided eye are sixth magnitude, while the brightest in the night sky, Sirius, is of magnitude −1.46. To standardize the magnitude scale, astronomers chose Vega and several similar stars and averaged their brightness to represent magnitude zero at all wavelengths. Thus, for many years, Vega was used as a baseline for the calibration of absolute photometric brightness scales. However, this is no longer the case, as the apparent magnitude zero point is now commonly defined in terms of a particular numerically specified flux. This approach is more convenient for astronomers, since Vega is not always available for calibration and varies in brightness.

The UBV photometric system measures the magnitude of stars through ultraviolet, blue and yellow filters, producing U, B and V values, respectively. Vega is one of six A0V stars that were used to set the initial mean values for this photometric system when it was introduced in the 1950s. The mean magnitudes for these six stars were defined as: U − B = B − V = 0. In effect, the magnitude scale has been calibrated so that the magnitude of these stars is the same in the yellow, blue and ultraviolet parts of the electromagnetic spectrum. Thus, Vega has a relatively flat electromagnetic spectrum in the visual region—wavelength range 350–850 nanometers, most of which can be seen with the human eye—so the flux densities are roughly equal; 2,000–4,000 Jy. However, the flux density of Vega drops rapidly in the infrared, and is near 100 Jy at 5 micrometers.

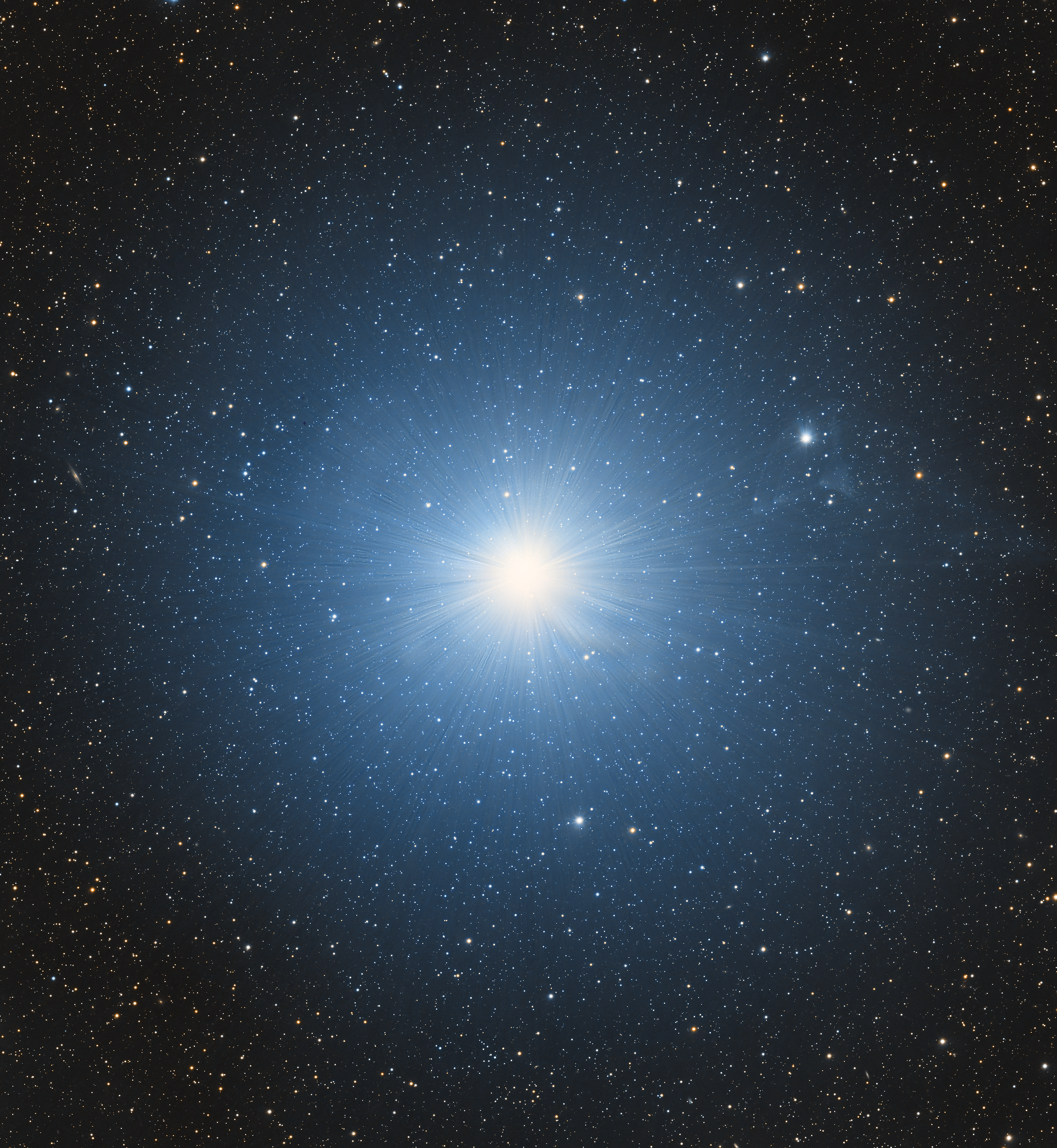
Photograph of Vega captured in March 2025

Photometric measurements of Vega during the 1930s appeared to show that the star had a low-magnitude variability on the order of ±0.03 magnitude (around ±2.8% (Note: From Cox, Arthur N., ed. (1999). Allen's Astrophysical Qualities (4th ed.). New York: Springer-Verlag. p. 382. ISBN 978-0-387-98746-0.: M_{bol} = −2.5 log L/L_{☉} + 4.74, where M_{bol} is the bolometric magnitude, L is the star's luminosity, and L_{☉} is the solar luminosity. A M_{bol} variation of ±0.03 gives M_{bol_{2}} − M_{bol_{1}} = 0.03 = 2.5 log L_{1}/L_{2} for L_{1}/L_{2} = 10^{0.03/2.5} ≈ 1.028, or a ±2.8% luminosity variation.) luminosity). This range of variability was near the limits of observational capability for that time, and so the subject of Vega's variability has been controversial. The magnitude of Vega was measured again in 1981 at the David Dunlap Observatory and showed some slight variability. Thus it was suggested that Vega showed occasional low-amplitude pulsations associated with a Delta Scuti variable. This is a category of stars that oscillate in a coherent manner, resulting in periodic pulsations in the star's luminosity. Although Vega fits the physical profile for this type of variable, other observers have found no such variation. Thus the variability was thought to possibly be the result of systematic errors in measurement. However, a 2007 article surveyed these and other results, and concluded that "A conservative analysis of the foregoing results suggests that Vega is quite likely variable in the 1–2% range, with possible occasional excursions to as much as 4% from the mean". Also, a 2011 article affirms that "The long-term (year-to-year) variability of Vega was confirmed".

Vega became the first solitary main-sequence star beyond the Sun known to be an X-ray emitter when in 1979 it was observed from an imaging X-ray telescope launched on an Aerobee 350 from the White Sands Missile Range. In 1983, Vega became the first star found to have a disk of dust. The Infrared Astronomical Satellite (IRAS) discovered an excess of infrared radiation coming from the star, and this was attributed to energy emitted by the orbiting dust as it was heated by the star.

== Physical characteristics ==
Vega's spectral class is A0V, making it a blue-tinged white main-sequence star that is fusing hydrogen to helium in its core. Since more massive stars use their fusion fuel more quickly than smaller ones, Vega's main-sequence lifetime is roughly one billion years, a tenth of the Sun's. The current age of this star is about 700 million years, or up to about half its expected total main-sequence lifespan. After leaving the main sequence, Vega will become a class-M red giant and shed much of its mass, finally becoming a white dwarf. At present, Vega has more than twice the mass of the Sun and its bolometric luminosity is about 40 times the Sun's. Because it is rotating rapidly, approximately once every 16.5 hours, and seen nearly pole-on, its apparent luminosity, calculated assuming it was the same brightness all over, is about 57 times the Sun's. If Vega is variable, then it may be a Delta Scuti type with a period of about 0.107 day.

Most of the energy produced at Vega's core is generated by the carbon–nitrogen–oxygen cycle (CNO cycle), a nuclear fusion process that combines protons to form helium nuclei through intermediary nuclei of carbon, nitrogen and oxygen. This process becomes dominant at a temperature of about 17 million K, which is slightly higher than the core temperature of the Sun, but is less efficient than the Sun's proton–proton chain fusion reaction. The CNO cycle is highly temperature sensitive, which results in a convection zone about the core that evenly distributes the 'ash' from the fusion reaction within the core region. The overlying atmosphere is in radiative equilibrium. This is in contrast to the Sun, which has a radiation zone centered on the core with an overlying convection zone.

The energy flux from Vega has been precisely measured against standard light sources. At 5,480 Å, the flux density is 3,650 Jy with an error margin of 2%. The visual spectrum of Vega is dominated by absorption lines of hydrogen; specifically by the hydrogen Balmer series with the electron at the n=2 principal quantum number. The lines of other elements are relatively weak, with the strongest being ionized magnesium, iron and chromium. The X-ray emission from Vega is very low, demonstrating that the corona for this star must be very weak or non-existent. However, as the pole of Vega is facing Earth and a polar coronal hole may be present, confirmation of a corona as the likely source of the X-rays detected from Vega (or the region very close to Vega) may be difficult as most of any coronal X-rays would not be emitted along the line of sight.

Using spectropolarimetry, a magnetic field has been detected on the surface of Vega by a team of astronomers at the Observatoire du Pic du Midi. This is the first such detection of a magnetic field on a spectral class A star that is not an Ap chemically peculiar star. The average line of sight component of this field has a strength of −0.6±0.3 gauss (G). This is comparable to the mean magnetic field on the Sun. Magnetic fields of roughly 30 G have been reported for Vega, compared to about 1 G for the Sun. In 2015, bright starspots were detected on the star's surface—the first such detection for a normal A-type star, and these features show evidence of rotational modulation with a period of 0.68 day.

=== Rotation ===
Vega has a rotation period of 16.3 hours, much faster than the Sun's rotational period but similar to, and slightly slower than, those of Jupiter and Saturn. Because of that, Vega is significantly oblate like those two planets.

When the radius of Vega was measured to high accuracy with an interferometer, it resulted in an unexpectedly large estimated value of 2.73±0.01 times the radius of the Sun. This is 60% larger than the radius of the star Sirius, while stellar models indicated it should only be about 12% larger. However, this discrepancy can be explained if Vega is a rapidly rotating star that is being viewed from the direction of its pole of rotation. Observations by the CHARA array in 2005–06 confirmed this deduction.

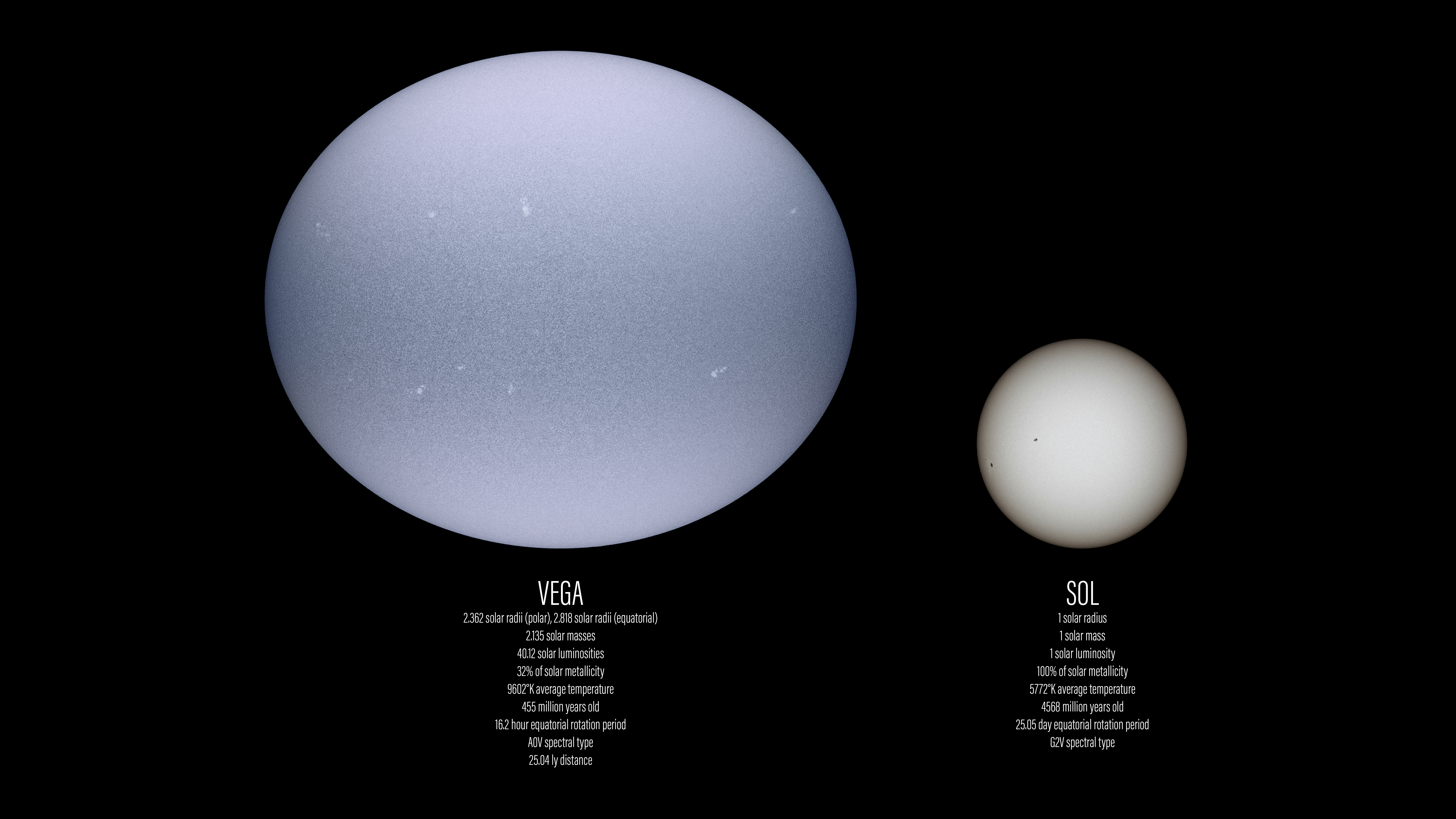
Size comparison of Vega (left) to the Sun (right)

The pole of Vega—its axis of rotation—is inclined no more than five degrees from the line-of-sight to the Earth. At the high end of estimates for the rotation velocity for Vega is 236.2±3.7 km/s along the equator, much higher than the observed (i.e. projected) rotational velocity because Vega is seen almost pole-on. This is 88% of the speed that would cause the star to start breaking up from centrifugal effects. This rapid rotation of Vega produces a pronounced equatorial bulge, so the radius of the equator is 19% larger than the polar radius, compared to just under 11% for Saturn, the most oblate of the Solar System's planets. The measured polar radius of this star is 2.418 solar radii, while the equatorial radius is 2.726 solar radii. From the Earth, this bulge is being viewed from the direction of its pole, producing the overly large radius estimate.

The local surface gravity at the poles is greater than at the equator, which produces a variation in effective temperature over the star: the polar temperature is near 10,000 K, while the equatorial temperature is about 8,152 K. This large temperature difference between the poles and the equator produces a strong gravity darkening effect. As viewed from the poles, this results in a darker (lower-intensity) limb than would normally be expected for a spherically symmetric star. The temperature gradient may also mean that Vega has a convection zone around the equator, while the remainder of the atmosphere is likely to be in almost pure radiative equilibrium. By the Von Zeipel theorem, the local luminosity is higher at the poles. As a result, if Vega were viewed along the plane of its equator instead of almost pole-on, then its overall brightness would be lower.

As Vega had long been used as a standard star for calibrating telescopes, the discovery that it is rapidly rotating may challenge some of the underlying assumptions that were based on it being spherically symmetric. With the viewing angle and rotation rate of Vega now better known, this will allow improved instrument calibrations.

=== Element abundance ===
In astronomy, those elements with higher atomic numbers than helium are termed "metals". The metallicity of Vega's photosphere is only about 32% of the abundance of heavy elements in the Sun's atmosphere. (Note: For a metallicity of −0.5, the proportion of metals relative to the Sun is given by $$10^{-0.5} = 0.316$$. See: Matteucci, Francesca (2001). The Chemical Evolution of the Galaxy. Astrophysics and Space Science Library. Vol. 253. Springer Science & Business Media. p. 7. ISBN 978-0792365525.) (Compare this, for example, to a threefold metallicity abundance in the similar star Sirius as compared to the Sun.) For comparison, the Sun has an abundance of elements heavier than helium of about Z_{Sol} = 0.0172±0.002. Thus, in terms of abundances, only about 0.54% of Vega consists of elements heavier than helium. Nitrogen is slightly more abundant, oxygen is only marginally less abundant and sulfur abundance is about 50% of solar. On the other hand, Vega has only 10% to 30% of the solar abundance for most other major elements with barium and scandium below 10%.

The unusually low metallicity of Vega makes it a weak Lambda Boötis star. However, the reason for the existence of such chemically peculiar, spectral class A0–F0 stars remains unclear. One possibility is that the chemical peculiarity may be the result of diffusion or mass loss, although stellar models show that this would normally only occur near the end of a star's hydrogen-burning lifespan. Another possibility is that the star formed from an interstellar medium of gas and dust that was unusually metal-poor.

The observed helium to hydrogen ratio in Vega is 0.030±0.005, which is about 40% lower than the Sun. This may be caused by the disappearance of a helium convection zone near the surface. Energy transfer is instead performed by the radiative process, which may be causing an abundance anomaly through diffusion.

=== Kinematics ===
The radial velocity of Vega is the component of this star's motion along the line-of-sight to the Earth. Movement away from the Earth will cause the light from Vega to shift to a lower frequency (toward the red), or to a higher frequency (toward the blue) if the motion is toward the Earth. Thus the velocity can be measured from the amount of shift of the star's spectrum. Precise measurements of this blueshift give a value of −13.9±0.9 km/s. The minus sign indicates a relative motion toward the Earth.

Motion transverse to the line of sight causes the position of Vega to shift with respect to the more distant background stars. Careful measurement of the star's position allows this angular movement, known as proper motion, to be calculated. Vega's proper motion is 202.03±0.63 milliarcseconds (mas) per year in right ascension—the celestial equivalent of longitude—and 287.47±0.54 mas/y in declination, which is equivalent to a change in latitude. The net proper motion of Vega is 327.78 mas/y, which results in angular movement of a degree every 11,000 years.

In the galactic coordinate system, the space velocity components of Vega are (U, V, W) = (−16.1±0.3, −6.3±0.8, −7.7±0.3) km/s, for a net space velocity of 19 km/s. Although Vega is at present only the fifth-brightest star in the night sky, the star is slowly brightening as proper motion causes it to approach the Sun. Vega will make its closest approach in an estimated 264,000 years at a perihelion distance of 13.2 ly (4.04 pc).

Based on this star's kinematic properties, it appears to belong to a stellar association called the Castor Moving Group. However, Vega may be much older than this group, so the membership remains uncertain. This group contains about 16 stars, including Alpha Librae, Alpha Cephei, Castor, Fomalhaut and Vega. All members of the group are moving in nearly the same direction with similar space velocities. Membership in a moving group implies a common origin for these stars in an open cluster that has since become gravitationally unbound. The estimated age of this moving group is 200±100 million years, and they have an average space velocity of 16.5 km/s. (Note: The space velocity components in the Galactic coordinate system are: U = −10.7±3.5, V = −8.0±2.4, W = −9.7±3.0 km/s. UVW is a Cartesian coordinate system, so the Euclidean distance formula applies. Hence, the net velocity is $$v_\text{sp} = \sqrt{10.7^2 + 8.0^2 + 9.7^2} = 16.5~\text{km/s}.$$ See: Bruce, Peter C. (2015). Introductory Statistics and Analytics: A Resampling Perspective. John Wiley & Sons. p. 20. ISBN 978-1118881330.)

== Possible planetary system ==
The Vega planetary system
Companion (in order from star)	Mass	Semimajor axis (AU)	Orbital period (days)	Eccentricity	Inclination (°)	Radius
(unconfirmed)	≥21.9±5.1 M_{🜨}	0.04555±0.00053	2.42977±0.00016	0.25±0.15	—	—
Hot dust	≤0.2 AU				—	—
(unconfirmed)	20 M_{🜨}	~2–5	—	—	—	—
Inner Disk	(3–5)–78 AU				7-8°	—
(unconfirmed)	<6 M_{🜨}	~65	—	—	—	—
Outer Disk	78–170 AU				9-11°	—
Halo	<250 AU				—	—

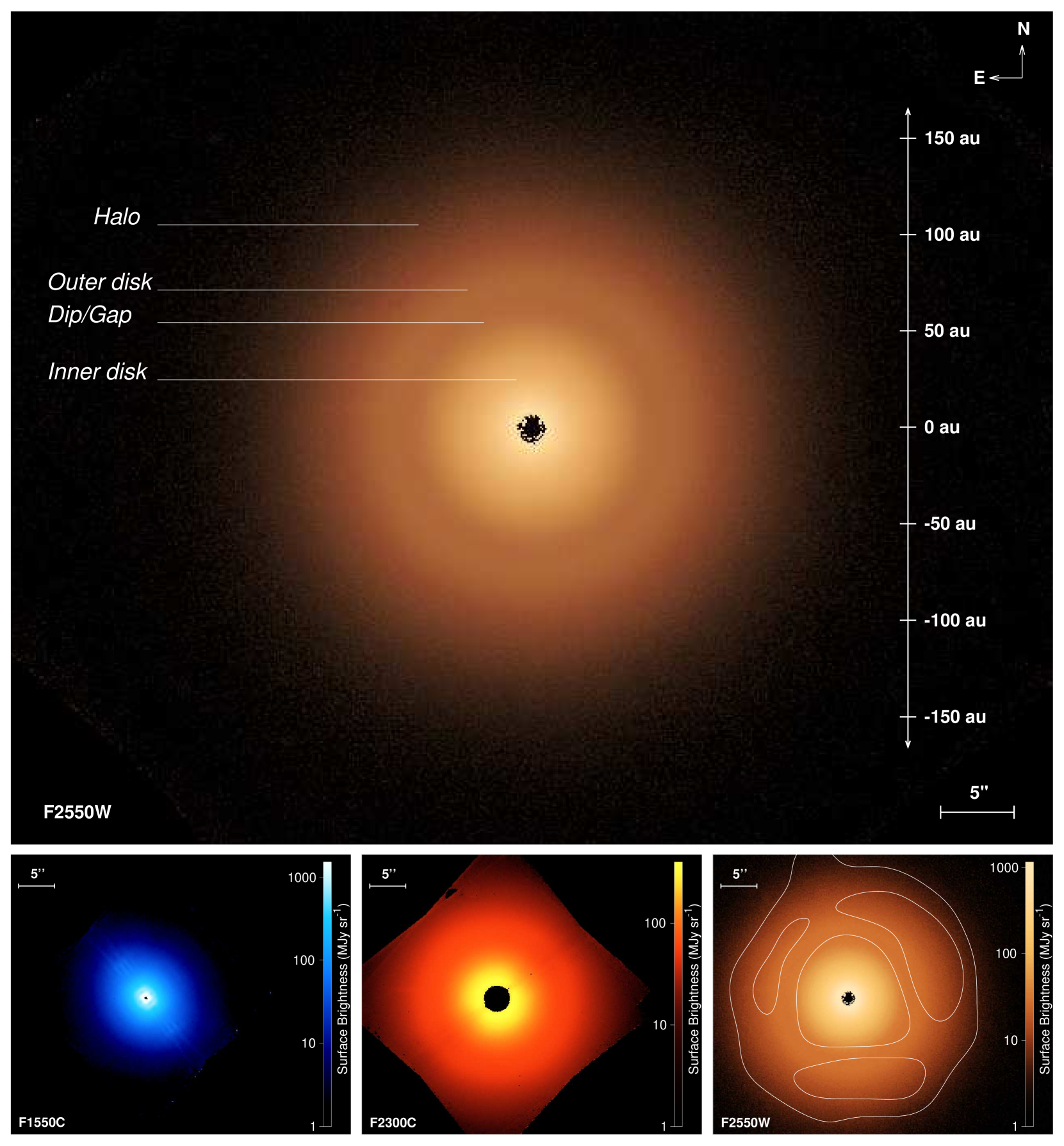
The debris disk around Vega with JWST MIRI (all images) and ALMA (contours lower right image). Image published by Su et al.

=== Infrared excess ===
One of the early results from the Infrared Astronomy Satellite (IRAS) was the discovery of excess infrared flux coming from Vega, beyond what would be expected from the star alone. This excess was measured at wavelengths of 25, 60 and 100 μm, and came from within an angular radius of 10 arcseconds (10″) centered on the star. At the measured distance of Vega, this corresponded to an actual radius of 80 astronomical units (AU), where an AU is the average radius of the Earth's orbit around the Sun. It was proposed that this radiation came from a field of orbiting particles with a dimension on the order of a millimetre, as anything smaller would eventually be removed from the system by radiation pressure or drawn into the star by means of Poynting–Robertson drag. The latter is the result of radiation pressure creating an effective force that opposes the orbital motion of a dust particle, causing it to spiral inward. This effect is most pronounced for tiny particles that are closer to the star.

Subsequent measurements of Vega at 193 μm showed a lower than expected flux for the hypothesized particles, suggesting that they must instead be on the order of 100 μm or less. To maintain this amount of dust in orbit around Vega, a continual source of replenishment would be required. A proposed mechanism for maintaining the dust was a disk of coalesced bodies that were in the process of collapsing to form a planet. Models fitted to the dust distribution around Vega indicate that it is a 120-astronomical-unit-radius circular disk viewed from nearly pole-on. In addition, there is a hole in the center of the disk with a radius of no less than 80 AU.

Following the discovery of an infrared excess around Vega, other stars have been found that display a similar anomaly that is attributable to dust emission. As of 2002, about 400 of these stars have been found, and they have come to be termed "Vega-like" or "Vega-excess" stars. It is believed that these may provide clues to the origin of the Solar System.

=== Debris disks ===
By 2005, the Spitzer Space Telescope had produced high-resolution infrared images of the dust around Vega. It was shown to extend out to 43″ (330 AU) at a wavelength of 24 μm, 70″ (543 AU) at 70 μm and 105″ (815 AU) at 160 μm. These much wider disks were found to be circular and free of clumps, with dust particles ranging from 1–50 μm in size. The estimated total mass of this dust is 3×10^{−3} times the mass of the Earth (around 7.5 times more massive than the asteroid belt). Production of the dust would require collisions between asteroids in a population corresponding to the Kuiper Belt around the Sun. Thus the dust is more likely created by a debris disk around Vega, rather than from a protoplanetary disk as was earlier thought.

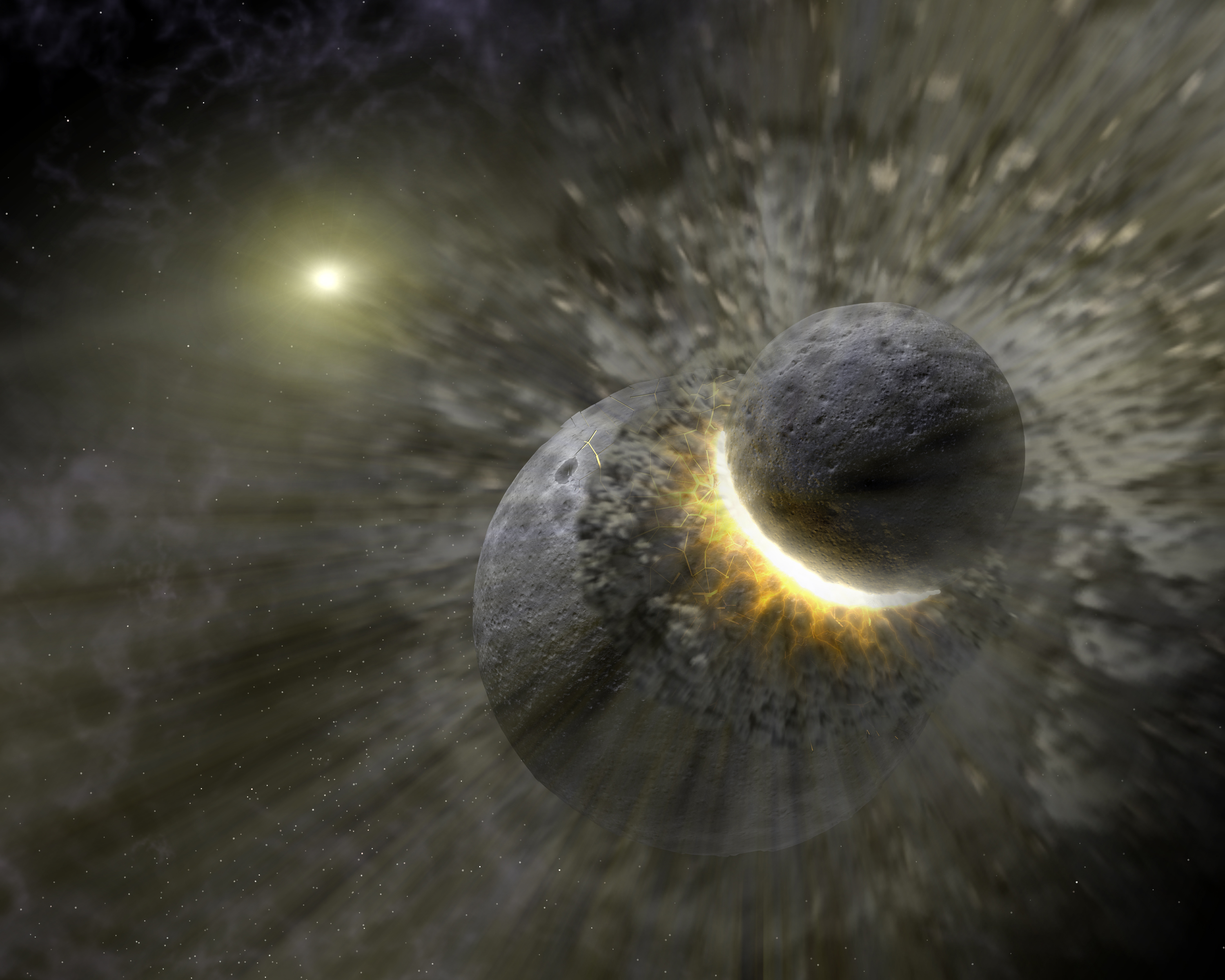
Artist's concept of a recent massive collision of dwarf planet-sized objects that may have contributed to the dust ring around Vega

The inner boundary of the debris disk was estimated at 11″±2″, or 70–100 AU. The disk of dust is produced as radiation pressure from Vega pushes debris from collisions of larger objects outward. However, continuous production of the amount of dust observed over the course of Vega's lifetime would require an enormous starting mass—estimated as hundreds of times the mass of Jupiter. Hence it is more likely to have been produced as the result of a relatively recent breakup of a moderate-sized (or larger) comet or asteroid, which then further fragmented as the result of collisions between the smaller components and other bodies. This dusty disk would be relatively young on the time scale of the star's age, and it will eventually be removed unless other collision events supply more dust.

Observations, first with the Palomar Testbed Interferometer by David Ciardi and Gerard van Belle in 2001 and then later confirmed with the CHARA array at Mt. Wilson in 2006 and the Infrared Optical Telescope Array at Mt. Hopkins in 2011, revealed evidence for an inner dust band around Vega. Originating within 8 AU of the star, this exozodiacal dust may be evidence of dynamical perturbations within the system. This may be caused by an intense bombardment of comets or meteors, and may be evidence for the existence of a planetary system.

The disk was also observed with ALMA in 2020, the LMT in 2022 and with Hubble STIS and JWST MIRI in 2024. The ALMA image did resolve the outer disk for the first time. The Hubble observation is claimed as the first image of the disk in scattered light and found an outer halo made up of small dust grains. JWST observations also detected the Halo, the outer disk and for the first time the inner disk. The infrared observations also showed a gap at 60 AU for the first time. The dust interior of the outer disk is consistent with dust being dragged by the Poynting-Robertson effect. The inner edge of the inner disk is hidden behind the coronagraph, but it was inferred to be 3-5 AU from photometry. The star is also surrounded by hot infrared excess, located at the sub-AU region, leaving a second gap between the inner disk and the hot dust around the star. This hot infrared excess lies within about 0.2 AU or closer and is made up of small grains, like graphite and iron and manganese oxides, which was previously verified.

=== Possible planets ===
Observations from the James Clerk Maxwell Telescope in 1997 revealed an "elongated bright central region" that peaked at 9″ (70 AU) to the northeast of Vega. This was hypothesized as either a perturbation of the dust disk by a planet or else an orbiting object that was surrounded by dust. However, images by the Keck telescope had ruled out a companion down to magnitude 16, which would correspond to a body with more than 12 times the mass of Jupiter. Astronomers at the Joint Astronomy Centre in Hawaii and at UCLA suggested that the image may indicate a planetary system still undergoing formation.

Determining the nature of the planet has not been straightforward; a 2002 paper hypothesizes that the clumps are caused by a roughly Jupiter-mass planet on an eccentric orbit. Dust would collect in orbits that have mean-motion resonances with this planet—where their orbital periods form integer fractions with the period of the planet—producing the resulting clumpiness.

In 2003, it was hypothesized that these clumps could be caused by a roughly Neptune-mass planet having migrated from 40 to 65 AU over 56 million years, an orbit large enough to allow the formation of smaller rocky planets closer to Vega. The migration of this planet would likely require gravitational interaction with a second, higher-mass planet in a smaller orbit.

Using a coronagraph on the Subaru Telescope in Hawaii in 2005, astronomers were able to further constrain the size of a planet orbiting Vega to no more than 5–10 times the mass of Jupiter. The issue of possible clumps in the debris disc was revisited in 2007 using newer, more sensitive instrumentation on the Plateau de Bure Interferometer. The observations showed that the debris ring is smooth and symmetric. No evidence was found of the blobs reported earlier, casting doubts on the hypothesized giant planet. The smooth structure has been confirmed in follow-up observations by Hughes et al. (2012) and the Herschel Space Telescope.

Although a planet has yet to be directly observed around Vega, the presence of a planetary system cannot yet be ruled out. Thus there could be smaller, terrestrial planets orbiting closer to the star. The inclination of planetary orbits around Vega is likely to be closely aligned to the equatorial plane of this star.

From the perspective of an observer on a hypothetical planet around Vega, the Sun would appear as a faint 4.3-magnitude star in the constellation Columba. (Note: The Sun would appear at the diametrically opposite coordinates from Vega at α = 6^{h} 36^{m} 56.3364^{s}, δ = −38° 47′ 01.291″, which is in the western part of Columba. The visual magnitude is given by $m = M_v - 5 - 5 \log_{10}$ π$\ \Rightarrow \ 4.83 - 5 - (5 \ \times \log_{10}0.13023) = 4.256$ See: Hughes, David W. (2006). "The Introduction of Absolute Magnitude (1902–1922)". Journal of Astronomical History and Heritage. 9 (2): 173–179. Bibcode:2006JAHH....9..173H. doi:10.3724/SP.J.1440-2807.2006.02.06. S2CID 115611984.)

In 2021, a paper analyzing 10 years of spectra of Vega detected a candidate 2.43-day signal around Vega, statistically estimated to have only a 1% chance of being a false positive. Considering the amplitude of the signal, the authors estimated a minimum mass of 21.9±5.1 Earth masses, but considering the very oblique rotation of Vega itself of only 6.2° from Earth's perspective, the planet may be aligned to this plane as well, giving it an actual mass of 203±47 Earth masses. The researchers also detected a faint 196.4+1.6
−1.9-day signal which could translate to 80±21 Earth masses (740±190 at 6.2° inclination) but is too faint to claim as a real signal with available data.

Observations of the disk with JWST MIRI did find a very circular face-on disk. The morphology indicates that there is no planet more massive than Saturn beyond 10 AU. The disk has a gap at around 60 AU. Gap-opening planets are inferred for disks around other stars and this has also been tested for Vega by running simulations. The simulations have shown that a planet with < 6 M_{🜨} at 65 AU would introduce interior asymmetric structures that are not seen in the disk of Vega. Any gap-opening planet would need to be less massive. Additionally the inner edge of the inner disk was inferred to be 3-5 AU. Vega shows also evidence for hot infrared excess at the sub-AU region. The inner boundary of the warm debris might indicate that there is a Neptune-mass planet inside, shepherding it.

== Etymology and cultural significance ==
The name Vega is believed to be derived from the Arabic term Al Nesr al Waki النسر الواقع which appeared in the Al Achsasi al Mouakket star catalogue and was translated into Latin as Vultur Cadens, "the falling eagle/vulture". (Note: That is, a vulture on the ground with its wings folded (Edward William Lane, Arabic-English Lexicon).) The constellation was represented as a vulture in ancient Egypt, and as an eagle or vulture in ancient India. The Arabic name then appeared in the western world in the Alfonsine tables, which were drawn up between 1215 and 1270 by order of King Alfonso X. Medieval astrolabes of England and Western Europe used the names Wega and Alvaca, and depicted it and Altair as birds.

Among the northern Polynesian people, Vega was known as whetu o te tau, the year star. For a period of history it marked the start of their new year when the ground would be prepared for planting. Eventually this function became denoted by the Pleiades. A Hawaiian name is Kehoʻoea; in Native Hawaiian culture objects can have different names depending on their position in the sky, so it is also known as Kahōʻeoa, Kahoʻea or Keoe.

The Assyrians named this pole star Dayan-same, the "Judge of Heaven", while in Akkadian it was Tir-anna, "Life of Heaven". In Babylonian astronomy, Vega may have been one of the stars named Dilgan, "the Messenger of Light". To the ancient Greeks, the constellation Lyra was formed from the harp of Orpheus, with Vega as its handle. For the Roman Empire, the start of autumn was based upon the hour at which Vega set below the horizon.

In Chinese, 織女 (Zhī Nǚ), meaning Weaving Girl (asterism), refers to an asterism consisting of Vega, ε Lyrae and ζ^{1} Lyrae. Consequently, the Chinese name for Vega is 織女一 (Zhī Nǚ yī, English: the First Star of Weaving Girl). In Chinese mythology, there is a love story of Qixi (七夕) in which Niulang (牛郎, Altair) and his two children (β Aquilae and γ Aquilae) are separated from their mother Zhinü (織女, lit. "weaver girl", Vega) who is on the far side of the river, the Milky Way. However, one day per year on the seventh day of the seventh month of the Chinese lunisolar calendar, magpies make a bridge so that Niulang and Zhinü can be together again for a brief encounter. The Japanese Tanabata festival, in which Vega is known as Orihime (織姫), is also based on this legend.

In Zoroastrianism, Vega was sometimes associated with Vanant, a minor divinity whose name means "conqueror".

The indigenous Boorong people of north-western Victoria, Australia, named it Neilloan, "the flying loan".

In Hindu astronomy and astrology, Vega is represented by the nakshatra Abhijit (अभिजित). In the Srimad Bhagavatam, Shri Krishna tells Arjuna, that among the Nakshatras he is Abhijit, which indicates the auspiciousness of this Nakshatra.

Medieval astrologers counted Vega as one of the Behenian stars and related it to chrysolite and winter savory. Cornelius Agrippa listed its kabbalistic sign under Vultur cadens, a literal Latin translation of the Arabic name. Medieval star charts also listed the alternate names Waghi, Vagieh and Veka for this star.

W. H. Auden's 1933 poem "A Summer Night (to Geoffrey Hoyland)" famously opens with the couplet, "Out on the lawn I lie in bed,/Vega conspicuous overhead". In the 1997 film Contact, the Vega system is the source of alien communication.

Vega became the first star to have a car named after it with the French Facel Vega line of cars from 1954 onwards, and later on, in America, Chevrolet launched the Vega in 1971. Other vehicles named after Vega include the ESA's Vega launch system and the Lockheed Vega aircraft.
