= Message to Altair =

1983 interstellar radio message

Message to Altair (Japanese: アルタイルへのメッセージ), officially named CALL to the COSMOS'83, was an interstellar radio message sent from a radio telescope in Stanford, California, USA to the star Altair in 1983. The message was part of a collaboration with Weekly Shonen Jump, commemorating the publication's 15th anniversary.

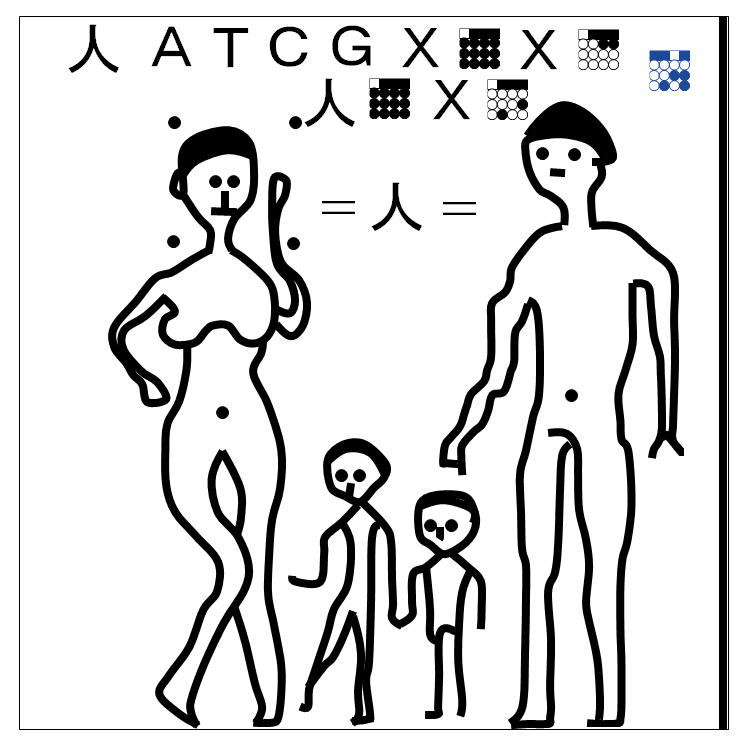
A recreation of page 11 of the message. It features a drawing of an adult female and male, along with two children.

== Transmission ==
The message consisted of two parts: audio containing messages from children; and a set of 13 bitmap images produced by astronomers Masaki Morimoto and Hisashi Hirabayashi. The message was transmitted on August 15, 1983 from Stanford, California, USA, with each part being sent over 30 minutes.

The 13 images show numbers, DNA, as well as the evolution of living things from simple organisms to humans. The images in the table below are recreations of the original images sent, which were actually 71 x 71 bits in size. This size was chosen because the product of 71, 71, and 13 is close to the number 2^{16}.

Parts of the images are colour-coded for ease of reading:

- Black: numbers, text
- Green: elements
- Blue: lengths

Images sent in the transmission
Number	Recreated Image	Explanation
1		Numbers and elements From top to bottom, left to right: Numbers 1-12; Prime numbers; Powers of 3; Addition; Multiplication; Elements: H, He, C, N, O; Molecules & their wavelengths; Hydrogen atom: 21.1 cm; OH: 18.6 cm, 18.0 cm, 18.0 cm, 17.4 cm; H_{2}CO: 6.2 cm; H_{2}O: 1.3 cm; NO: 6.9 mm; HCN: 3.4 mm; CH: 2.6 mm; 3.4 mm × 62 = 21.1 cm; Atomic structure; ^{8}O; ^{11}Na
2		Solar System Middle: diagrams (not to scale) of the celestial bodies that make up the Solar System.: Starts at the top with the Sun; Below the Sun, the planets are shown in order of distance; Some larger moons are shown around their relevant planets; Left: equatorial radii Right: mean distances from the Sun Upper-right: R = 10 m
3		Chemical formulae for DNA compounds
4		DNA structure and replication
5		Early primitive life Upper-right: diagram size = 0.5 mm: Gives a scale for the physical size of the objects in the diagram
6		Jellyfish Upper-right: diagram size = 10 cm Bottom: C + O_{2} = CO_{2}, representing the process of respiration
7		FIsh Upper-right: diagram size = 50 cm Middle: H_{2}O, indicating that the fish is in water
8		Amphibians Upper-right: diagram size = 1 m Middle: O_{2} × 1 and N_{2} × 4, representig the rough composition of the Earth's atmosphere Bottom: H_{2}O
9		Lizards or early mammals Upper-right: diagram size = 1 m
10		Apes Upper-right: diagram size = 2 m
11		Humans Upper-right: diagram size = 2 m Top: No. of DNA base pairs: ~200 million; World population: ~4.3 billion
12		Close up of the woman's face Upper-right: diagram size = 36.4 cm
13		Transmission parameters and a toast Top: total number of bits Left: Transmission wavelength: 70.8 cm; Radio telescope radius: 23.0 m; Right: Japanese and English words for toast (as in to raise a toast to someone); C_{2}H_{5}OH, the chemical formula for ethanol

== Search for a response ==
Altair is approximately 17 light-years away, so the message would have arrived around the year 2000. Hirabayashi said that while the possibility is not high, if Altair has intelligent life, we could expect a reply from 2017 at the earliest.

In 2023, Shinya Narusawa, who had known Morimoto before his death, asked the Japan Aerospace Exploration Agency (JAXA) for cooperation in looking for any potential reply from Altair. The radio antenna at Usuda Space Observatory observed Altair for an hour at 10 p.m. on August 22, 2023. This also fell on Tanabata according to old calendar – legend states that it is the only day of the year that deities Orihime and Hikoboshi (represented by Vega and Altair respectively) are allowed to meet each other. Narusawa aims to continue his observations by collaborating with other research institutions.
