= Altair =

Brightest star in the constellation Aquila

- Location of Altair (circled)

Observation data Epoch J2000 Equinox ICRS
- Constellation: Aquila
- Pronunciation: /ˈæltɛər/, /ˈæltaɪər/
- Right ascension: 19^{h} 50^{m} 46.99855^{s}
- Declination: +08° 52′ 05.9563″
- Apparent magnitude (V): 0.76

Characteristics
- Evolutionary stage: Main sequence
- Spectral type: A7Vn
- U−B color index: +0.09
- B−V color index: +0.22
- V−R color index: +0.14
- R−I color index: +0.13
- Variable type: Delta Scuti

Astrometry
Radial velocity (R_{v})	−26.1±0.9 km/s
Proper motion (μ)	RA: +536.23 mas/yr Dec.: +385.29 mas/yr
Parallax (π)	194.95±0.57 mas
Distance	16.73 ± 0.05 ly (5.13 ± 0.01 pc)
Absolute magnitude (M_{V})	2.22

Details
Mass	1.86±0.03 M_{☉}
Radius	2.008 ± 0.006 (equatorial); 1.565 ± 0.014 (polar) R_{☉}
Luminosity	10.6 L_{☉}
Surface gravity (log g)	4.29 cgs
Temperature	6,780 (equatorial); 8,621 (polar) K
Metallicity [Fe/H]	−0.2 dex
Rotation	7.77 hours
Rotational velocity (v sin i)	242 km/s
Age	88±10 Myr

Other designations
- Atair, α Aquilae, α Aql, Alpha Aquilae, Alpha Aql, 53 Aquilae, 53 Aql, BD+08°4236, FK5 745, GJ 768, HD 187642, HIP 97649, HR 7557, SAO 125122, WDS 19508+0852A, LFT 1499, LHS 3490, LTT 15795, NLTT 48314

Database references
SIMBAD	data

Altair is the brightest star in the equatorial constellation of Aquila and the twelfth-brightest star in the night sky. It has the Bayer designation Alpha Aquilae, which is Latinised from α Aquilae and abbreviated Alpha Aql or α Aql. Altair is an A-type main-sequence star with an apparent visual magnitude of 0.77 and is one of the vertices of the Summer Triangle asterism; the other two vertices are marked by Deneb and Vega. It is located at a distance of 16.7 light-years (5.1 parsecs) from the Sun. Altair is currently in the G-cloud—a nearby interstellar cloud formed from an accumulation of gas and dust.

Altair rotates rapidly, with a velocity at the equator of approximately 286 km/s. (Note: From values of v sin i and i in the second column of Table 1, Monnier et al. 2007.) This is a significant fraction of the star's estimated breakup speed of 400 km/s. A study with the Palomar Testbed Interferometer revealed that Altair is not spherical, but is flattened at the poles due to its high rate of rotation. Other interferometric studies with multiple telescopes, operating in the infrared, have imaged and confirmed this phenomenon.

== Nomenclature ==
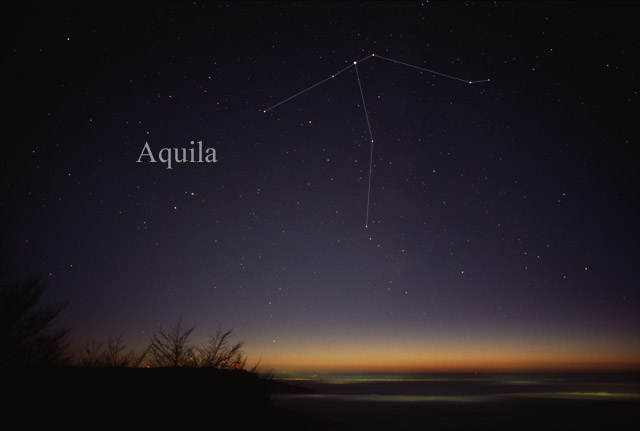
Altair is the brightest star in the constellation Aquila.

α Aquilae (Latinised to Alpha Aquilae) is the star's Bayer designation. The traditional name Altair has been used since medieval times. It is an abbreviation of the Arabic phrase النسر الطائر Al-Nasr Al-Ṭā'ir, "the flying eagle".

In 2016, the International Astronomical Union organized a Working Group on Star Names (WGSN) to catalog and standardize proper names for stars. The WGSN's first bulletin of July 2016 included a table of the first two batches of names approved by the WGSN, which included Altair for this star. It is now so entered in the IAU Catalog of Star Names.

== Physical characteristics ==
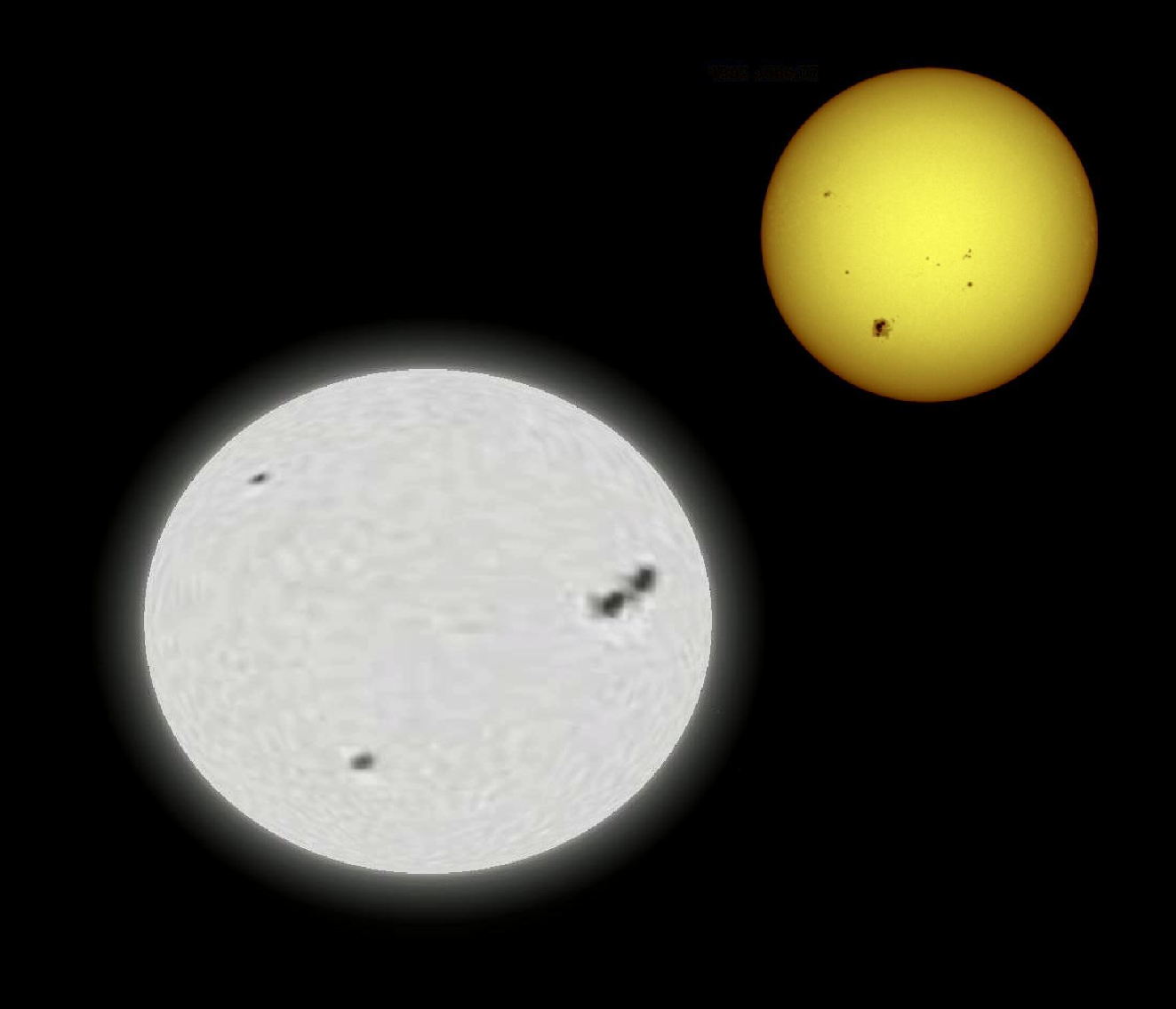
Altair in comparison with the Sun

Along with β Aquilae and γ Aquilae, Altair forms the well-known line of stars sometimes referred to as the Family of Aquila or Shaft of Aquila.

Altair is a type-A main-sequence star with about 1.8 times the mass of the Sun and 11 times its luminosity. It is thought to be a young star close to the zero age main sequence at about 100 million years old, although previous estimates gave an age closer to one billion years old. Altair rotates rapidly, with a rotational period of under eight hours; for comparison, the equator of the Sun makes a complete rotation in a little more than 25 days. Altair's rotation is similar to, and slightly faster than, those of Jupiter and Saturn. Like those two planets, its rapid rotation causes the star to be oblate; its equatorial diameter is over 20 percent greater than its polar diameter.

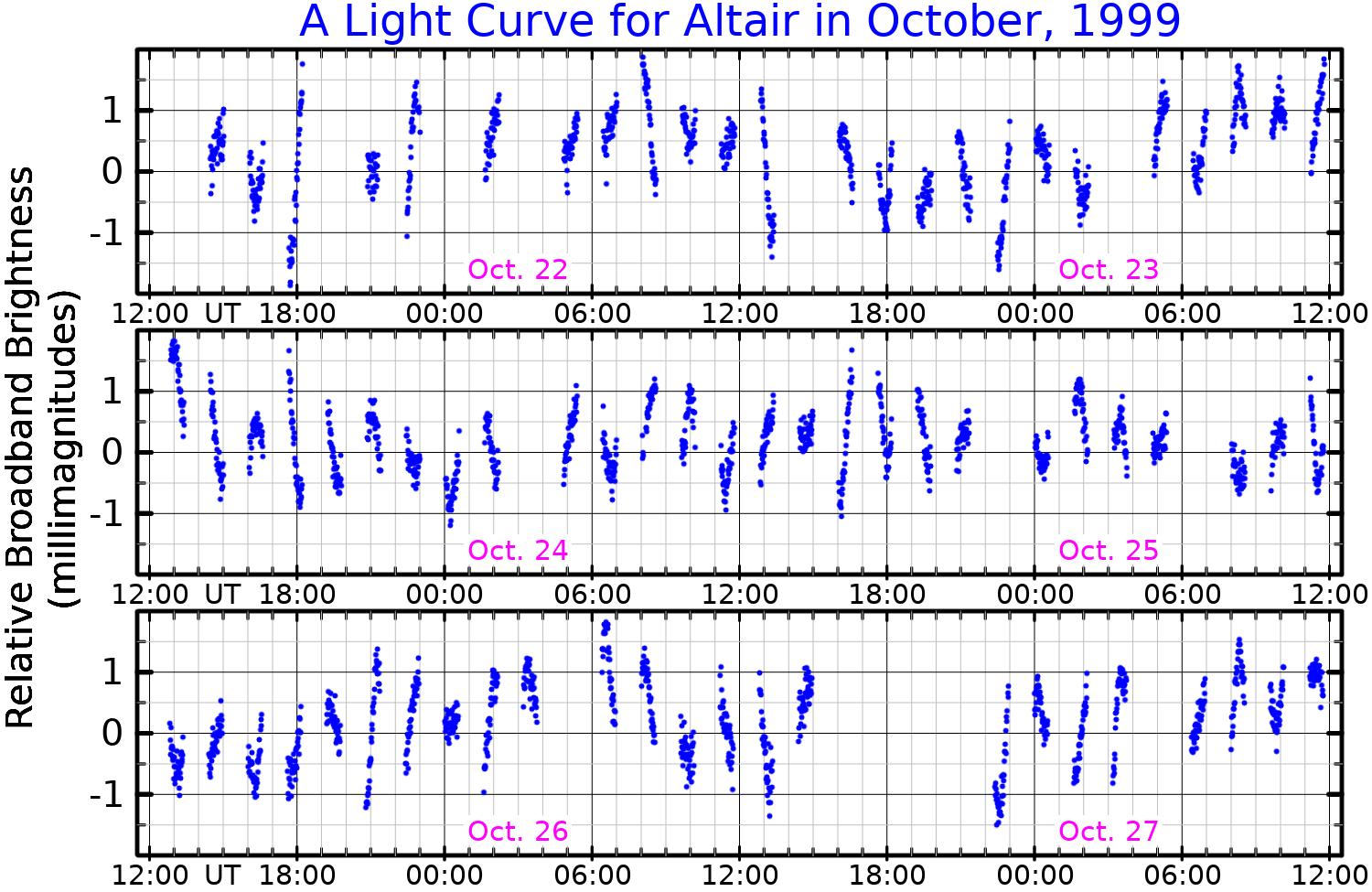
A light curve for Altair, adapted from Buzasi et al. (2005)

Satellite measurements made in 1999 with the Wide Field Infrared Explorer showed that the brightness of Altair fluctuates slightly, varying by just a few thousandths of a magnitude with several different periods less than 2 hours. As a result, it was identified in 2005 as a Delta Scuti variable star. Its light curve can be approximated by adding together a number of sine waves, with periods that range between 0.8 and 1.5 hours. It is a weak source of coronal X-ray emission, with the most active sources of emission being located near the star's equator. This activity may be due to convection cells forming at the cooler equator.

=== Rotational effects ===
The angular diameter of Altair was measured interferometrically by R. Hanbury Brown and his co-workers at Narrabri Observatory in the 1960s. They found a diameter of 3 milliarcseconds. Although Hanbury Brown et al. realized that Altair would be rotationally flattened, they had insufficient data to experimentally observe its oblateness. Later, using infrared interferometric measurements made by the Palomar Testbed Interferometer in 1999 and 2000, Altair was found to be flattened. This work was published by G. T. van Belle, David R. Ciardi and their co-authors in 2001.

Theory predicts that, owing to Altair's rapid rotation, its surface gravity and effective temperature should be lower at the equator, making the equator less luminous than the poles. This phenomenon, known as gravity darkening or the von Zeipel effect, was confirmed for Altair by measurements made by the Navy Precision Optical Interferometer in 2001, and analyzed by Ohishi et al. (2004) and Peterson et al. (2006). Also, A. Domiciano de Souza et al. (2005) verified gravity darkening using the measurements made by the Palomar and Navy interferometers, together with new measurements made by the VINCI instrument at the VLTI.

Altair is one of the few stars for which a resolved image has been obtained. In 2006 and 2007, J. D. Monnier and his coworkers produced an image of Altair's surface from 2006 infrared observations made with the MIRC instrument on the CHARA array interferometer; this was the first time the surface of any main-sequence star, apart from the Sun, had been imaged. The false-color image was published in 2007. The equatorial radius of the star was estimated to be 2.03 solar radii, and the polar radius 1.63 solar radii—a 25% increase of the stellar radius from pole to equator, versus 19% for Vega, 11% for Saturn, and 9% for Jupiter. The polar axis is inclined by about 60° to the line of sight from the Earth.

== Etymology, mythology and culture ==
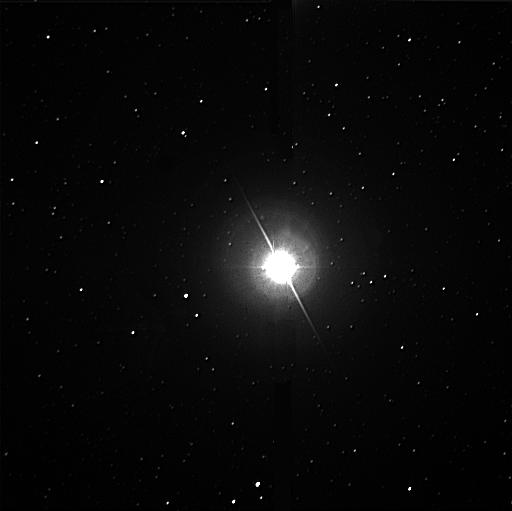
Altair

The term Al Nesr Al Tair appeared in Al Achsasi al Mouakket's catalogue, which was translated into Latin as Vultur Volans. This name was applied by the Arabs to the asterism of Altair, β Aquilae and γ Aquilae and probably goes back to the ancient Babylonians and Sumerians, who called Altair "the eagle star". The spelling Atair has also been used. Medieval astrolabes of England and Western Europe depicted Altair and Vega as birds.

The Koori people of Victoria also knew Altair as Bunjil, the wedge-tailed eagle, and β and γ Aquilae are his two wives the black swans. The people of the Murray River knew the star as Totyerguil. The Murray River was formed when Totyerguil the hunter speared Otjout, a giant Murray cod, who, when wounded, churned a channel across southern Australia before entering the sky as the constellation Delphinus.

In Chinese astronomy, the asterism consisting of Altair, β Aquilae and γ Aquilae is known as Hé Gǔ (河鼓; lit. "river drum"). The Chinese name for Altair is thus Hé Gǔ èr (河鼓二; lit. "river drum two", meaning the "second star of the drum at the river"). However, Altair is better known by its other names: Qiān Niú Xīng (牵牛星 / 牽牛星) or Niú Láng Xīng (牛郎星), translated as the cowherd star. These names are an allusion to a love story, The Cowherd and the Weaver Girl, in which Niulang (represented by Altair) and his two children (represented by β Aquilae and γ Aquilae) are separated from respectively their wife and mother Zhinü (represented by Vega) by the Milky Way. They are only permitted to meet once a year, when magpies form a bridge to allow them to cross the Milky Way. In the Japanese version of this legend, celebrated in the Tanabata festival, Altair is known as Hikoboshi (彦星).

The people of Micronesia call Altair Mai-lapa, meaning "big/old breadfruit", while the Māori call this star Poutu-te-rangi, meaning "pillar of heaven".

In Western astrology, Altair is considered a military star, associated with boldness, determination and risk-taking.

This star is one of the asterisms used by Bugis sailors for navigation, called bintoéng timoro, meaning "eastern star".

A group of Japanese scientists sent a radio signal to Altair in 1983 with the hopes of contacting extraterrestrial life.

NASA announced Altair as the name of the Lunar Surface Access Module (LSAM) on December 13, 2007. The Russian-made Beriev Be-200 Altair seaplane is also named after the star.

== Visual companions ==
The bright primary star has the multiple star designation WDS 19508+0852A and has several faint visual companion stars, WDS 19508+0852B, C, D, E, F and G. All are much more distant than Altair and not physically associated.

Multiple/double star designation: WDS 19508+0852
Component	Primary	Right ascension (α) Equinox J2000.0	Declination (δ) Equinox J2000.0	Epoch of observed separation	Angular distance from primary	Position angle (relative to primary)	Apparent magnitude (V)	Database reference
B	A	19^{h} 50^{m} 40.5^{s}	+08° 52′ 13″	2015	195.8″	286°	9.8	SIMBAD
C	A	19^{h} 51^{m} 00.8^{s}	+08° 50′ 58″	2015	186.4″	110°	10.3	SIMBAD
D	A			2015	26.8″	105°	11.9	
E	A			2015	157.3″	354°	11.0	
F	A	19^{h} 51^{m} 02.0^{s}	+08° 55′ 33″	2015	292.4″	48°	10.3	SIMBAD
G	A			2015	185.1″	121°	13.0	

== Search for planets ==
A search for the presence of gas giants using direct imaging with JWST in 2026 turned up negative, in which the point sources found near to Altair were identified as background stars.

== See also ==
- Historical brightest stars
- Lists of stars
- List of brightest stars
- List of nearest bright stars
- List of most luminous stars
