= Gamma Aquilae =

Star in the constellation Aquila

γ Aquilae
- Location of γ Aquilae (circled)

Observation data Epoch J2000 Equinox ICRS
- Constellation: Aquila
- Right ascension: 19^{h} 46^{m} 15.58029^{s}
- Declination: +10° 36′ 47.7408″
- Apparent magnitude (V): +2.712

Characteristics
- Spectral type: K3 II
- U−B color index: +1.720
- B−V color index: +1.500

Astrometry
| Radial velocity (R_{v}) | −2.79 km/s |
| Proper motion (μ) | RA: +16.99 mas/yr Dec.: −2.98 mas/yr |
| Parallax (π) | 8.26±0.17 mas |
| Distance | 395 ± 8 ly (121 ± 2 pc) |
| Absolute magnitude (M_{V}) | −3.38+0.24 −0.22 |

Details
| Mass | 3.51±0.23 M_{☉} |
| Radius | 91.81+2.19 −2.12 R_{☉} |
| Luminosity | 2,146±139 L_{☉} |
| Surface gravity (log g) | 1.52 cgs |
| Temperature | 4,098±56 K |
| Metallicity [Fe/H] | −0.29 dex |
| Rotational velocity (v sin i) | 8 km/s |
| Age | 270±40 Myr |

Other designations
- Tarazed, Reda, Gamma Aql, γ Aql, 50 Aql, BD+10 4043, FK5 741, HD 186791, HIP 97278, HR 7525, SAO 105223

Database references
| SIMBAD | data |

Gamma Aquilae is a star in the constellation of Aquila. Its Bayer designation is Latinized from γ Aquilae, and abbreviated Gamma Aql or γ Aql. The star has the proper name Tarazed, pronounced /ˈtærəzɛd/. It has an apparent visual magnitude of 2.712, making it readily visible to the naked eye at night. Parallax measurements place it at a distance of 395 light-years (121 parsecs) from the Sun. The star is drifting closer to the Sun with a radial velocity of −2.8 km/s.

== Properties ==
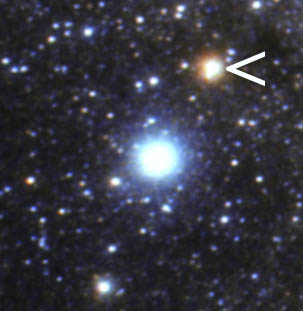
Position of γ Aquilae relative to Altair (center)

Gamma Aquilae is a relatively young star with an age of about 270 million years. Nevertheless, it has reached a stage of its evolution where it has consumed the hydrogen at its core and expanded into what is termed a bright giant star, with a stellar classification of K3 II. The star is now burning helium into carbon in its core. After it has finished generating energy through nuclear fusion, Gamma Aquilae will become a white dwarf.

The star has an estimated 3.5 times the mass of the Sun and has expanded to 92 times the Sun's radius. It is radiating over 2,100 times the luminosity of the Sun. An effective temperature of 4,098 K in its outer envelope gives it the orange hue typical of K-type stars. A 1991 catalogue of photometry reported that Gamma Aquilae showed some variation in its brightness, but this has not been confirmed. It is a known source of X-ray emission, which is most likely being emitted by a hot corona.

Gamma Aquilae is located just 7' from the center of an emission nebula, which has been first reported in 2023 by Stefan Ziegenbalg. The star is unlikely to be the ionization source of this nebula.

== Nomenclature ==
γ Aquilae (Latinised to Gamma Aquilae) is the star's Bayer designation.

It bore the traditional name Tarazed, derived from the Persian شاهين ترازو shāhīn-i tarāzū "the scale beam" or "the balance", referring to an asterism of Alpha, Beta and Gamma Aquilae. The name Alshain for Beta Aquilae is derived from the same Persian term. In 2016, the International Astronomical Union organized a Working Group on Star Names (WGSN) to catalogue and standardize proper names for stars. The WGSN approved the name Tarazed for this star on 21 August 2016 and it is now so entered in the IAU Catalog of Star Names.

In the catalogue of stars in the Calendarium of Al Achsasi Al Mouakket, this star was designated Menkib al Nesr (منكب ألنسر - mankib al-nasr), which was translated into Latin as Humerus Vulturis, meaning 'the eagle's shoulder'.

In Chinese astronomy, 河鼓 (Hé Gŭ), meaning River Drum, refers to an asterism consisting of Gamma Aquilae, Beta Aquilae and Altair. Consequently, the Chinese name for Gamma Aquilae itself is 河鼓三 (Hé Gŭ sān, English: the Third Star of River Drum). In the Chinese folk tale The Cowherd and the Weaver Girl, Gamma Aquilae and Beta Aquilae are the children of Niulang (牛郎, The Cowherd, Altair) and Zhinü (織女, The Princess, Vega).

The Koori people of Victoria knew Beta and Gamma Aquilae as the black swan wives of Bunjil (Altair), the wedge-tailed eagle.
