= Gerard van Belle =

American astronomer (born 1968)

Gerard Theodore van Belle
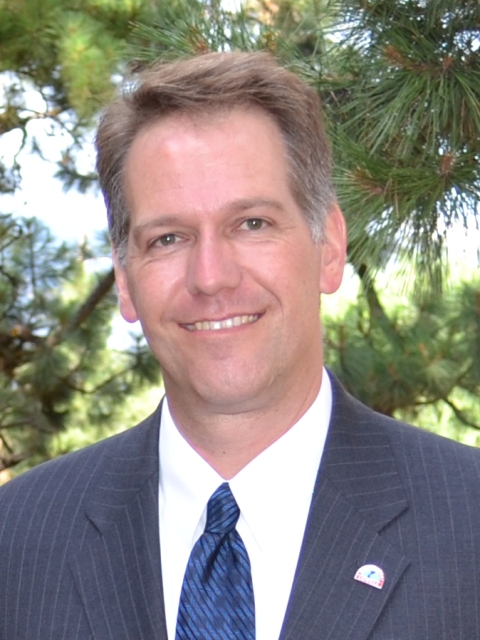
- Born: 30 October 1968 (age 58); Tallahassee, Florida
- Education: University of Wyoming, Johns Hopkins University, Whitman College
- Known for: The use of interferometry in studies of the stellar structure and detection of extrasolar planets.
- Awards: 2002 Edward Stone Award for Outstanding Research Publication
- Scientific career
- Fields: Astronomy
- Workplaces: Lowell, ESO, Caltech, JPL, St. Mary's College of Maryland
- Thesis: Angular Size Measurements of Highly Evolved Stars (1996)
- Doctoral advisor: H. Mel Dyck

Gerard Theodore van Belle (born October 30, 1968) is an American astronomer. He is an expert in optical (visible and near-infrared) astronomical interferometry. Dr. van Belle is currently the President and Observatory Director at the Las Cumbres Observatory.

== Education ==
van Belle received a bachelor's degree in physics from Whitman College in 1990, a master's degree in physics from The Johns Hopkins University in 1993, and a Ph.D. in physics from the University of Wyoming in 1996. While at Whitman College, he initiated as a member of the Sigma Chi fraternity.

== Career ==
After schooling, van Belle took a position at the Jet Propulsion Laboratory as an instrument architect for NASA's Keck Interferometer, and later joined the Michelson Science Center (now NASA Exoplanet Science Institute) at Caltech in 2003. He has participated in the commissioning of the Palomar Testbed Interferometer, and the CHARA Array. In 2007, he became a member of the astronomy faculty at the European Southern Observatory (ESO), and instrument scientist for the PRIMA instrument of ESO's VLTI facility; later in early 2011 he was also appointed instrument scientist for the MATISSE instrument of the VLTI. In August 2011 he took a position as a member of the astronomer faculty at Lowell Observatory, was granted tenure in 2014, and was appointed the Director for Science at Lowell Observatory in May 2024. In May 2017 he was appointed the Director of the Navy Precision Optical Interferometer (NPOI), and after a one-year tenure became Chief Scientist for the facility, until 2022. In September of 2026 Dr. van Belle was appointed the President and Observatory Director of the Las Cumbres Observatory in Santa Barbara, CA.

=== Research ===
van Belle has utilized near-infrared astronomical interferometers to measure the sizes of hundreds of nearby stars. The first direct measurement of stellar shape was carried out by a team led by him using the Palomar Testbed Interferometer to make observations of the rapidly rotating star Altair. He also contributed to practical considerations of operating astronomical interferometers, particularly regarding considerations of calibration of these complicated instruments.

=== Leadership ===
van Belle served as President of the International Astronomical Union's Commission 54 on Optical and Infrared Interferometry, for 2012–2015, after terms as Vice President (2009–2012) and Secretary (2006–2009).

=== Honors, awards and accolades ===
Asteroid 25155 van Belle is named for him. In 2018 Dr. van Belle was named a recipient of the Significant Sig Award of the Sigma Chi fraternity.
