= USS Alshain =

Cargo ship of the United States Navy

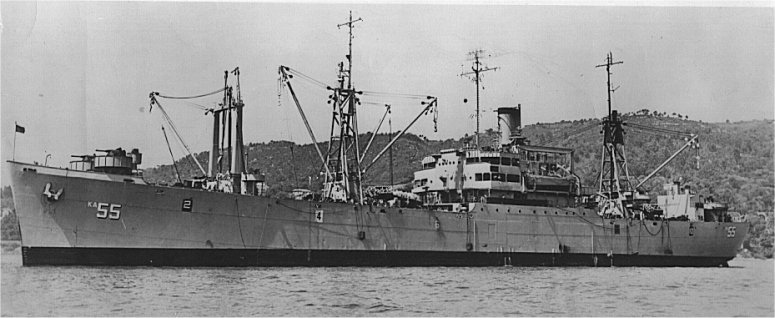
- USS Alshain (AKA-55)

History

United States
- Name: USS Alshain
- Namesake: The star Alshain in the constellation Aquila
- Builder: Federal Shipbuilding and Drydock Company, Kearny, New Jersey
- Laid down: 29 October 1943
- Launched: 26 January 1944
- Commissioned: 1 April 1944
- Decommissioned: 14 January 1956
- Reclassified: USNS Alshain (T-AKA-55), 1 October 1949
- Stricken: 1 July 1960
- Honours and awards: 5 battle stars (World War II); 3 battle stars (Korea)
- Fate: Sold for scrap, 16 February 1978

General characteristics
- Class & type: Andromeda-class attack cargo ship
- Type: Type C2-S-B1
- Displacement: 14,200 long tons (14,428 t) full
- Length: 459 ft 2 in (139.95 m)
- Beam: 63 ft (19 m)
- Draft: 26 ft 4 in (8.03 m)
- Speed: 16.5 knots (30.6 km/h; 19.0 mph)
- Complement: 392
- Armament: 1 × 5-inch/38-caliber gun mount; 4 × twin 40 mm gun mounts; 18 × 20 mm gun mounts

USS Alshain (AKA-55) (nicknamed "Johnny") was an Andromeda-class attack cargo ship in the service of the United States Navy. She was named after the star Alshain in the constellation Aquila, and served as a commissioned ship for 11 years and 9 months.

Alshain (AKA-55) was laid down on 29 October 1943 under a Maritime Commission contract (MC hull 209) at Kearny, New Jersey, by the Federal Shipbuilding & Drydock Co., launched on 26 January 1944, sponsored by Mrs. J. H. King, acquired by the Navy on 31 March 1944, and placed in commission at Brooklyn, New York, on 1 April 1944.

== Service history ==
=== World War II, 1944–1945 ===
After fitting out at the New York Navy Yard, the new attack cargo ship got underway for shakedown training in the Chesapeake Bay. She entered the Norfolk Navy Yard for an availability on 27 April, took on cargo early in May, and sailed for the Hawaiian Islands on the 13th. Alshain transited the Panama Canal, joined the Pacific Fleet, and arrived at Pearl Harbor on 2 June. There, she reported for duty to Commander, Amphibious Forces, Pacific Fleet. The ship was ordered to return to San Diego to serve as an amphibious training ship, and she set a course for the west coast of the United States.

Alshain reached San Diego on 20 June but was ordered to replenish fuel and provisions and return to Hawaii. Upon her arrival at Pearl Harbor on the 28th, she was assigned to temporary Transport Division (TransDiv) 38 and began loading combat cargo and Army personnel scheduled to participate in the invasion of Guam. On 1 July, the vessel set sail for Eniwetok to join Task Force 51 as a part of the Southern Transport Group. The combined forces sortied from that atoll on 17 July and arrived off Agat Beach, Guam, on the 21st.

Landing operations began early that morning. Alshain had difficulty unloading her cargo due to a shortage of boats and congestion on the beach itself. She finally completed the process on 3 August and retired toward Eniwetok. The ship then sailed independently to Pearl Harbor where she embarked more Army troops and loaded their equipment before getting underway on 27 August for amphibious landing rehearsals at Lahaina Roads, Maui. On 15 September, Alshain sailed with Task Group (TG) 33.1 for Eniwetok and a planned invasion of Yap. However, the attack on Yap was later cancelled, and Leyte, Philippines, was substituted as an objective. The cargo vessel departed Eniwetok on 26 September, bound for Manus, Admiralty Islands, the forward staging area for the assault on Leyte.

Alshain reached that port on 3 October and made final preparations for the invasion of the Philippines. On 14 October, she sortied with TG 79.1 which entered Leyte Gulf on the 20th. Alshain anchored in the transport area off Dulag, Leyte, and began lowering her boats at 0730. Despite enemy air harassment, the unloading proceeded so smoothly that the ship completed her work on the 23rd and headed back to Seeadler Harbor, Manus.

Getting underway again on 7 November, Alshain proceeded to Hollandia, New Guinea, to take on the personnel and material of the Army Air Service Command. She then rendezvoused with other ships off Biak, Schouten Islands, to form Task Unit (TU) 79.15.4, which proceeded to Leyte Gulf to reinforce Allied forces in the Philippines.

The task unit arrived in the waters off Tanauan, Leyte, on the 118th and underwent a Japanese air attack that morning. Alshain joined the others in firing on the enemy intruders. One "A6M Zero" approached the cargo ship and dived from directly astern in what seemed to be a strafing or dive bombing attack. However, intense antiaircraft fire caused the plane to burst into flames, and it splashed close aboard Alpine (APA-92), anchored 800 yards (730 m) away. The next day, Alshain left Tanauan to return to Seeadler Harbor.

On 28 November, the cargo ship sailed for Finschhafen, New Guinea; paused there on the 29th; and then pressed on to Bougainville, Solomon Islands, arriving in Empress Augusta Bay on 1 December. She embarked members of the 37th Infantry Division and got underway on the 16th for training exercises in Huon Gulf, New Guinea. Alshain finished the exercises and returned to Manus on the 21st. On the last day of 1944, she sortied with TG 79.1 for the assault on Luzon, Philippines.

The ships passed through Surigao Strait, the Mindanao and Sulu Seas, and entered the South China Sea on 8 January 1945. On that day, when a small group of enemy planes attacked the transports, Alshain helped to fight off the attack. She continued on toward Luzon, entered Lingayen Gulf on the 9th, and unloaded her cargo. The ship then returned to Leyte to embark personnel for landings to be conducted in the San Felipe-San Narciso area of Luzon.

The vessel sailed on 26 January to waters off Luzon, disembarked her passengers on the 29th, and returned to Leyte Gulf on 1 February. During the next two months, the cargo ship remained in Philippine waters replenishing supplies, assisting in unloading merchant ships, and carrying out training exercises in preparation for the invasion of Okinawa. She left the Philippines on 27 March with Task Unit (TU) 51.13.1 and arrived off Okinawa on 1 April.

The Japanese struck back with numerous air attacks against Allied shipping in an attempt to ward off the assault. On 1 April, a kamikaze crashed into Alpine which was anchored some 400 yards (370 m) away. Alshain rescued a badly burned soldier who had been blown off Alpine's deck by the crash. The attack cargo ship completed her unloading on the 5th, withdrew from the area, and headed for Apra Harbor, Guam. She then proceeded via Pearl Harbor to Seattle, Washington, where she entered the Lake Washington Shipyard, Houghton, Washington, on 2 May for an availability.

After the completion of the yard period on the 18th, the ship took on cargo at Tacoma, Washington, and proceeded to San Francisco. During this run, trouble developed with the superheater tubes in the boilers. Alshain entered the Bethlehem Steel Co. repair yard at San Francisco on 2 June for two weeks of repair work. On the 16th, the ship set a course for Eniwetok and spent a fortnight in port there in early July before getting underway for Guam.

Alshain reached Apra Harbor on 18 July and discharged a portion of her provisions. Her next destination was Tulagi, Solomon Islands, where she paused on 10 August to take on supplies. The vessel reached Nouméa, New Caledonia, on the 14th. Here, she received word of Japan's capitulation.

After the end of the war, Alshain continued her role as a cargo supply ship. Among the islands she served during the next three months were Eniwetok, Guam, and Okinawa. The ship reached Pearl Harbor on 3 December and discharged her cargo. On the 16th, she got underway for Seattle, Washington. On that same day, the ship also detached from Amphibious Forces, Pacific Fleet. Alshain reached Seattle on 23 December and prepared to enter the Puget Sound Naval Shipyard for an extended availability.

=== Inter-war service, 1946–1950 ===
In May 1946, the ship was assigned to the Naval Transport Service and resumed her cargo supply runs to various points in the Pacific. She left San Francisco on 7 June for a cruise via Pearl Harbor to Okinawa and Sasebo, Japan. She departed Japanese waters on 7 August bound for the east coast of the United States. The vessel transited the Panama Canal on 2 September and reached Norfolk on the 8th. She remained there for a month and then made a brief trip to Davisville, Rhode Island. After touching back at Norfolk, Alshain continued on south to transit the Panama Canal on 21 October and reached Terminal Island, California, on the 30th.

Alshain commenced another tour of Far Eastern ports on 22 November. Among her ports of call were Guam; Pearl Harbor; Yokosuka, Japan; Tsingtao and Shanghai, China; Okinawa; and Subic Bay and Samar, Philippines. Alshain arrived back in San Francisco on 7 August 1947 and spent five months there, interrupted only briefly late in November by a run to San Diego. On 2 January 1948, the vessel began a series of trips carrying supplies and equipment to Guam from San Francisco. Four were completed between January and August 1948.

After a period of yard work at the Puget Sound Naval Shipyard in October and November, Alshain got underway for the western Pacific. During this trip, she carried several tons of ammunition to Kuomintang forces on Taiwan; delivered supplies at Subic Bay and Yokohama, Japan; visited the ports of Shanghai and Tsingtao in China; and touched at Guam before reporting back to San Francisco on 7 March 1949.

Alshain operated along the west coast from March through July. On 21 July, the ship set out from San Francisco, bound via Pearl Harbor for Guam, where she arrived on 7 August. During her stay at that island, the cargo ship became a part of the newly formed Military Sea Transportation Service and was reclassified as USNS Alshain (T-AKA-55).

She left Guam on 15 September, transited the Panama Canal on 9 October, and arrived off Onslow Beach, N.C., on the 15th. Two weeks later the vessel moved to the Hampton Roads area but sailed for Caribbean waters on 10 November, and touched at Port-au-Prince, Haiti, four days later. After paying one more call at Norfolk, Alshain transited the Panama Canal on 15 December, reached San Francisco on 30 December, and closed the year there in upkeep.

Alshain set sail for Guam on 26 January 1950. She arrived back at San Diego on 27 March. After operations along the California coast, the cargo ship shaped a course for Japan on 26 April. She visited Yokosuka and Yokohama in May and touched at Naha, Okinawa, and Guam before pulling back into port at San Francisco on 26 June.

=== Korean War, 1950–1953 ===
The outbreak of war in Korea caused Alshain to depart San Diego on 14 July with elements of the 1st Provisional Marine Brigade embarked for transportation to Korea. The ship sailed with TG 53.7 from Yokosuka to Pusan, Korea, where she arrived on 2 August. Upon completion of debarking operations, the cargo vessel reached Yokosuka on the 7th. The ship then passed under the control of Amphibious Group 1, was fitted out to receive special boats for amphibious operations, and conducted training exercises late in August in Chigasaki Bay off Honshū, Japan.

Alshain reported to Kobe, Japan, on 2 September to take on equipment, supplies, and personnel of the 1st Marine Division. On the 11th, she got underway for the invasion of Inchon, Korea. The vessel entered the transport area off Inchon on 15 September and began unloading operations which continued until the 21st. Touching at Kobe on the 24th, Alshain embarked supplies and equipment of the 1st Marine Division and Marine Air Group 33 and moved to Sasebo, Japan, on 9 October to top off her fuel tanks before getting underway later that same day for Inchon.

On 11 October, Alshain reached the Inchon area and loaded equipment and supplies for an upcoming amphibious operation. She departed Inchon on the 17th with TG 90.2, bound for Wonsan, Korea. However, clearance of mines delayed the start of the assault on Wonsan; and the task group was forced to retire along its approach route and wait. In the interim, South Korean forces moving north captured Wonsan and obviated the need for an assault landing. Thus when Alshain returned on the 26th to unload cargo and disembark troops, no enemy harassed her cargo operations, and she completed the mission on the 31st.

Alshain retraced her course to Japan and arrived at Moji on the island of Kyushu on 2 November. There, she began embarking troops of the 3rd Infantry Division for transportation to Wonsan. The ship arrived in the Wonsan area on 14 November and, by the 17th, had completed discharging her passengers. She then paused briefly at Yokohama for a four-day availability period before setting out for the west coast of the United States on 25 November. The vessel reached San Francisco on 11 December.

After three months of local operations and upkeep, Alshain left California on 16 March 1951, bound for the east coast. She navigated the Panama Canal on 1 April and continued on to Norfolk, where she arrived on the 15th. The ship left the Military Sea Transportation Service on 30 April to become a member of Amphibious Forces, Atlantic Fleet, and was assigned to TransDiv 23. She was involved in a series of local operations and training exercises at Onslow Beach, N.C., through 4 August when she got underway for her first Mediterranean cruise. The ship replenished ships of the 6th Fleet at Golfe Juan, France, from 17 to 25 August. She then proceeded to Port Lyautey, Morocco, and replenished naval shore activities located there. Early September found Alshain back in her new home port, Norfolk.

Her next mission sent the cargo ship to Morehead City, N.C., to take on marines for participation in LantFlex 52 off Vieques Island, Puerto Rico. Alshain arrived at Vieques on 1 October. During the cruise, were also made port calls at Bridgetown, Barbados, and Port of Spain, Trinidad. The ship left the Caribbean on 5 November, took part in an amphibious landing exercise on Onslow Beach on the 13th, and arrived back in Norfolk on the 18th.

In early January 1952, Alshain commenced her second Mediterranean tour. Her first stop was Naples, Italy, on 24 January. She then made a short trip to Suda Bay, Crete, and returned to Naples on 9 February. From 25 February through 16 March, the ship took part in Operation Grand Slam, held in conjunction with naval units of NATO allies. She later made port calls at Porto Scudo and Palermo, Sicily; Iraklion, Crete; Phaleron Bay, Greece; Beirut, Lebanon; and Cannes, France.

Returning from her Mediterranean cruise to Norfolk on 24 May, Alshain engaged in various exercises off the eastern seaboard and in Puerto Rican waters. A visit to New York City during the Fourth of July holiday period highlighted the ship's summer. After a three-week layover in the Norfolk area during the Christmas holidays, Alshain got underway on 4 January 1953 for amphibious landing exercises at Vieques. In late January, she headed north and entered the Boston Naval Shipyard on 1 February for availability.

Alshain resumed operations on 18 April and headed down the east coast toward the Caribbean for refresher training at Guantánamo Bay, Cuba, which lasted from 10 until 29 May. During this period, the cargo vessel was involved in two minor collisions: one with command ship Mount Olympus (AGC-8) on 13 May, and the other a few days later with oiler Niobrara (AO-72). These necessitated a restricted availability for the cargo ship for repairs from 23 June through 3 July at the Maryland Drydock Company of Baltimore, Maryland.

Upon completion of the yard work, Alshain began operations along the east coast. In late September, she transported marines from Morehead City to Vieques Island for amphibious training exercises. She returned to home port on 3 October and closed the year in an upkeep status. The cargo ship moved to Boston in late January 1953 for a period of repairs and alterations which lasted through mid-April.

Alshain sailed for the Caribbean from Norfolk on 6 May. She visited Guantánamo Bay and Port-au-Prince before reversing course back to Norfolk.

=== Post-war service, 1953–1955 ===
The ship operated in the Norfolk area through 8 August, when she got underway for a cruise to Yokohama with a cargo of ammunition, air base equipment, and personnel of Marine Aircraft Group 11. She touched en route at Port Everglades, Florida; transited the Panama Canal on 15 August; visited San Diego for two days in late August; and finally reached Yokohama on 10 September.

The cargo ship discharged her passengers and their equipment in Japan and got underway for her return trip on the 16th. Brief layovers at San Francisco, California, and Balboa, Canal Zone, preceded her arrival in Norfolk on 22 October. The ship then entered an extended tender availability. She began the year 1954 with a trip to the Caribbean for TRAEX 2–54 at Vieques Island. On 19 January, Alshain touched at Port Everglades and took on board elements of Marine Aircraft Group 32. After debarking the troops at Morehead City, the cargo ship returned to Norfolk on the 28th.

For the duration of 1954, Alshain was engaged in a series of short training cruises. In mid-February, she made a round-trip voyage to San Juan and Vieques, Puerto Rico, for landing operations and, upon her return, entered the Norfolk Naval Shipyard for an availability. She then operated in the area of Norfolk and Little Creek, Virginia, the Chesapeake Bay, and Onslow Beach and Morehead City, N.C. The ship was involved in LANTFLEX 1–55 in November off Onslow Beach.

Alshain began her last year of active duty, 1955, by picking up elements of the Fleet Marine Force at Morehead City. On 7 January 1955, she left the east coast en route to the Mediterranean. Alshain touched at Mers El Kébir, Algeria, on the 20th. She was then involved in amphibious operations in the Gulf of Arzew off Algeria. The ship continued on to visit Genoa and Naples, Italy; Istanbul, Turkey; Athens and Phaleron Bay, Greece; Suda Bay, Crete; Cannes and Marseille, France; Porto Scudo, Sardinia; and Barcelona, Spain. Alshain left Barcelona on 14 May and shaped a course back to the United States. Upon her arrival at Norfolk on the 28th, the ship began a period of leave and upkeep.

=== Decommissioning and scrapping, 1955–1978 ===
Alshain got underway in late June for Philadelphia. She entered the Philadelphia Naval Shipyard on 1 July to undergo pre-inactivation overhaul. The work was completed in early October, and the vessel proceeded to Orange, Texas, where she was placed in a reserve status on 12 October 1955. The ship was decommissioned on 14 January 1956. Her name was struck from the Navy List on 1 July 1960. She was transferred to the Maritime Administration and laid up at Beaumont, Texas. She was sold for scrap on 16 February 1978.

== Awards ==
USS Alshain earned five battle stars for her World War II service, and as USNS Alshain three battle stars for Korean War service.
