= Beta Aquilae =

Triple star system in the constellation Aquila

- Location of β Aquilae (circled)

Observation data Epoch J2000 Equinox ICRS
- Constellation: Aquila
- Right ascension: 19^{h} 55^{m} 18.793^{s}
- Declination: +06° 24′ 24.35″
- Apparent magnitude (V): 3.87 + 12.0

Characteristics
- Spectral type: G9.5 IV + M2.5 V
- U−B color index: 0.48
- B−V color index: 0.86
- R−I color index: 0.49
- Variable type: Suspected

Astrometry
Radial velocity (R_{v})	−40.3±0.09 km/s
Proper motion (μ)	RA: +45.944 mas/yr Dec.: −480.965 mas/yr
Parallax (π)	73.5249±0.1415 mas
Distance	44.36 ± 0.09 ly (13.60 ± 0.03 pc)
Absolute magnitude (M_{V})	+3.03

Details

A
Mass	1.24±0.02 M_{☉}
Radius	3.123±0.033 R_{☉}
Luminosity	6.18±0.26 L_{☉}
Surface gravity (log g)	3.66±0.03 cgs
Temperature	5,163±17 K
Metallicity [Fe/H]	−0.20±0.04 dex
Rotation	5.08697±0.00031 days
Rotational velocity (v sin i)	22.28 km/s
Age	4.77±0.50 Gyr

Other designations
- Alshain, Alschairn, β Aql, 60 Aquilae, BD+06°4357, FK5 749, GC 27587, GJ 771, HD 188512, HIP 98036, HR 7602, SAO 125235, PPM 168947, WDS 19553+0624, LHS 5350a, LTT 15822

Database references
SIMBAD	data
ARICNS	data

Beta Aquilae is a triple star system in the equatorial constellation of Aquila. Its name is a Bayer designation that is Latinized from β Aquilae, and abbreviated Beta Aql or β Aql. This system is visible to the naked eye as a point-like source with an apparent visual magnitude of 3.87. Based on parallax measurements, it is located at a distance of 44.4 light-years. It is drifting closer to the Sun with a radial velocity of −40 km/s, and is predicted to approach to within 27 light-years (8.4 pc) in roughly 207,000 years.

Its two visible components are designated Beta Aquilae A and B. The former is formally named Alshain /ælˈʃeɪn/, the traditional name for the system.

== Nomenclature ==
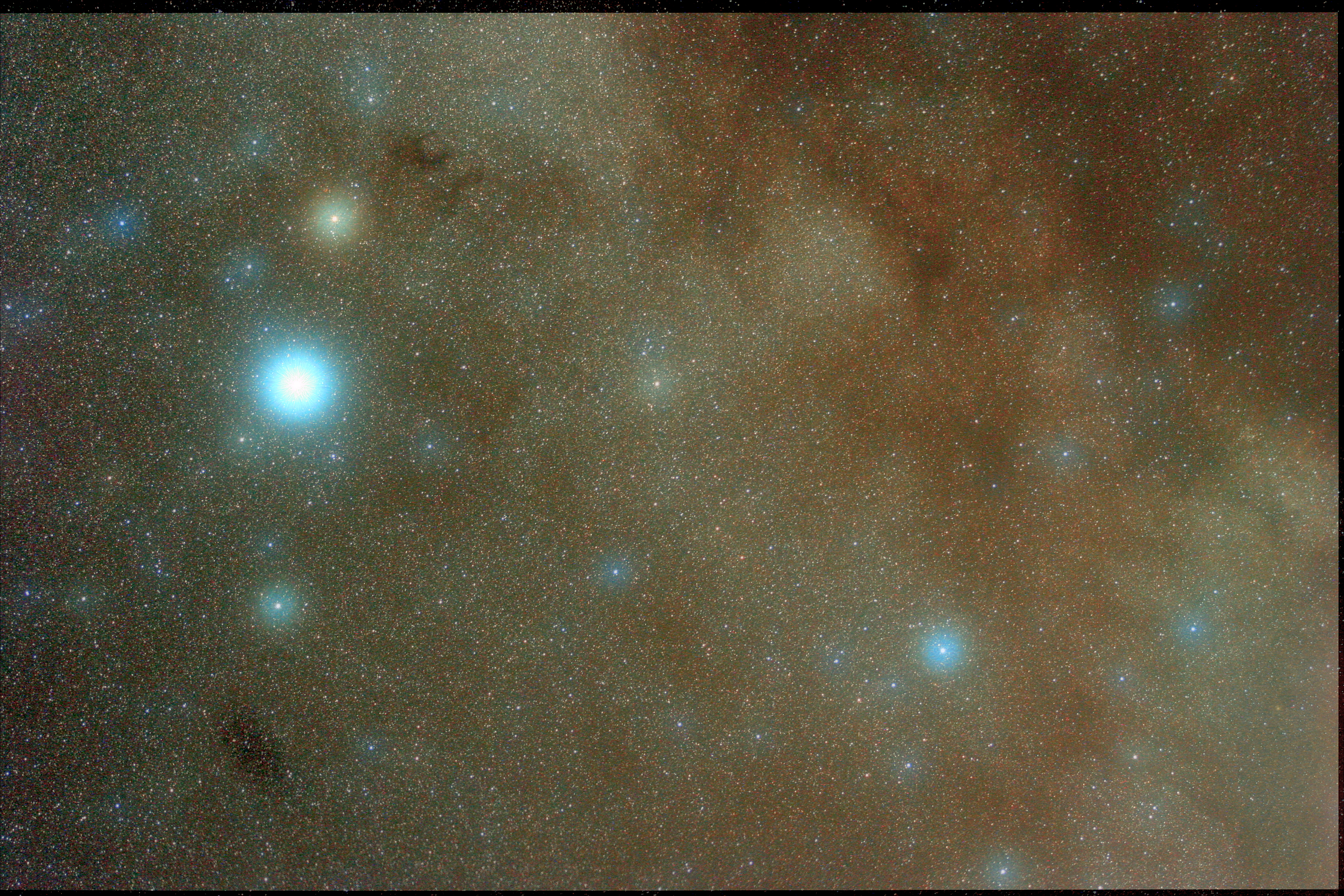
In this starfield showing many stars of Aquila constellation, the asterism α, β and γ Aquilae can be easily recognized on the left portion of the image.

β Aquilae (Latinised to Beta Aquilae) is the system's Bayer designation. The designations of the two components as Beta Aquilae A and B derive from the convention used by the Washington Multiplicity Catalog (WMC) for multiple star systems, and adopted by the International Astronomical Union (IAU).

The system bore the traditional name Alshain, derived from the Persian shāhīn-i tarazu "the scale beam", the Persian name for the asterism of α, β and γ Aquilae, itself a translation of the Arabic al-mizan "the balance". The name Tarazed for γ Aquilae is derived from the same Persian term. In 2016, the IAU organized a Working Group on Star Names (WGSN) to catalogue and standardize proper names for stars. The WGSN decided to attribute proper names to individual stars rather than entire multiple systems. It approved the name Alshain for the component Beta Aquilae A on 21 August 2016 and it is now so included in the List of IAU-approved Star Names.

In the catalogue of stars in the Calendarium of Al Achsasi al Mouakket, this star was designated Unuk al Ghyrab (عنق ألغراب - únuq al-ghuraab), which was translated into Latin as Collum Corvi, meaning the crow's neck.

In Chinese, 河鼓 (Hé Gŭ), meaning River Drum, refers to an asterism consisting of Beta Aquilae, Altair and Gamma Aquilae. Consequently, the Chinese name for Beta Aquilae itself is 河鼓一 (Hé Gŭ yī, English: the First Star of River Drum).

== Properties ==
The primary, component A, is of magnitude 3.71 and spectral class G8IV. It has a very low level of surface magnetic activity and may be in a state similar to a Maunder minimum. The activity shows a cycle of 969±27 d. The star displays solar-like oscillations. Since 1943, the spectrum of this star has served as one of the stable anchor points by which other stars are classified.

This is an aging subgiant star that has exhausted the supply of hydrogen at its core and is evolving into a giant. Its angular diameter has been precisely determined using interferometry at the CHARA array, which combined with its estimated distance, result in a radius 3.123 times the radius of the Sun. It has a mass 24% greater than the Sun's, a luminosity 6.2 times that of the Sun, and an effective temperature of 5,163 K.

The 12th magnitude secondary companion, designated component B, is a double-lined spectroscopic binary, which is at an angular separation of 13 arcseconds from the primary. It has a stellar classification of M2.5 V, matching a class M red dwarf.

== In culture ==
In the Chinese folk tale The Cowherd and the Weaver Girl, Beta and Gamma Aquilae are children of Niulang (牛郎, The Cowherd, Altair) and Zhinü (織女, The Princess, Vega).

The Koori people of Victoria knew Beta and Gamma Aquilae as the black swan wives of Bunjil (Altair), the wedge-tailed eagle.

USS Alshain (AKA-55) was a United States Navy ship.
