= John Adams Whipple =

American inventor and photographer (1822–1891)

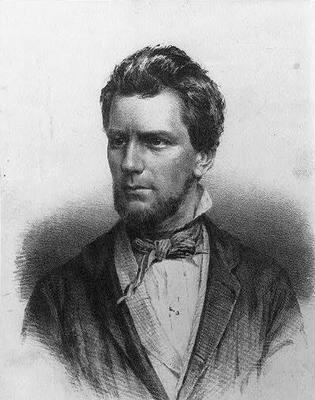
- From the August 1851 edition of the Photographic Art-Journal
- Born: September 10, 1822; Grafton, Massachusetts, U.S.
- Died: April 10, 1891 (aged 68); Cambridge, Massachusetts, U.S.
- Occupations: Photographer, inventor
- Years active: 1840−1891
- Known for: Photographic pioneer
- Spouse: Elizabeth Mann (m. 1847; died 1891)

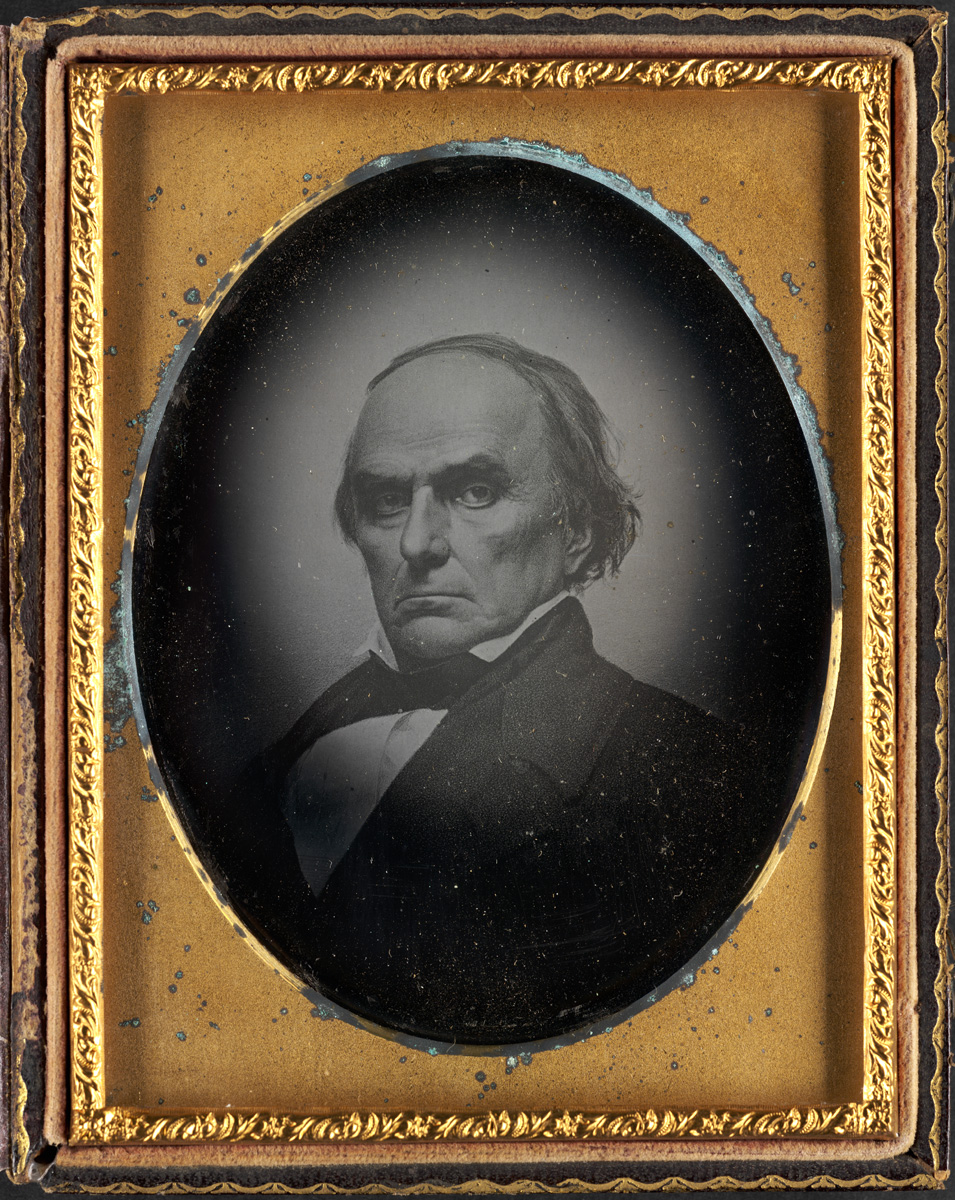
Portrait of Daniel Webster by J. A. Whipple, c. 1847

John Adams Whipple (September 10, 1822 – April 10, 1891) was an American inventor and early photographer. He was the first in the United States to manufacture the chemicals used for daguerreotypes. He pioneered astronomical and night photography. He was a prize-winner for his extraordinary early photographs of the moon and he was the first to produce images of stars other than the sun. Among those was the star Vega and the Mizar-Alcor stellar sextuple system, which was thought to be a double star until 2009.

== Biography ==
Whipple was born in Grafton, Massachusetts, to Jonathan and Melinda (Grout) Whipple. While a boy he was an ardent student of chemistry, and on the introduction of the daguerreotype process into the United States (1839–1840) he was the first to manufacture the necessary chemicals.

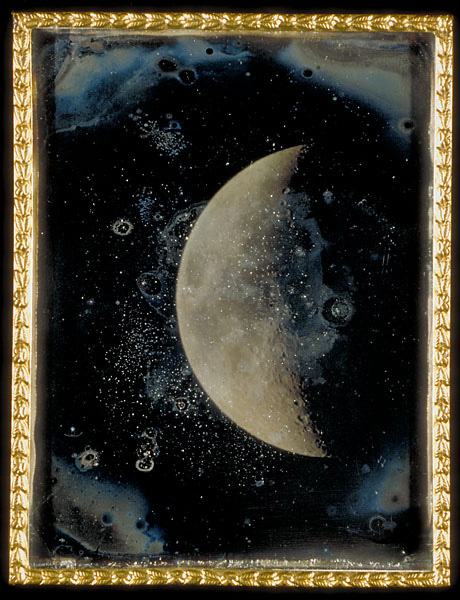
View of the Moon, by Whipple, February 26, 1852

His health having become impaired through this work, he devoted his attention to photography. He made his first daguerreotype in the winter of 1840, "using a sun-glass for a lens, a candle box for a camera, and the handle of a silver spoon as a substitute for a plate." Over time he became a prominent daguerreotype portraitist in Boston. In addition to making portraits for the Whipple and Black studio, Whipple photographed important buildings in and around Boston, including the house occupied by General George Washington in 1775 and 1776 (photographed circa 1855, now in the Smithsonian).

Whipple married Elizabeth Mann (1819–1891) on May 12, 1847, in Boston.

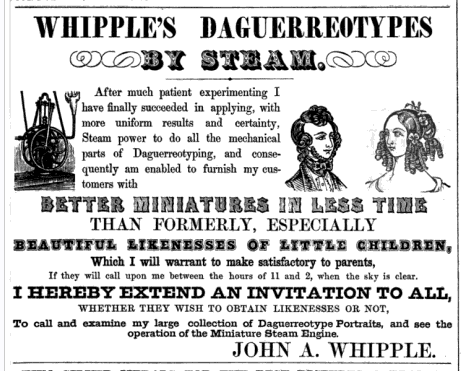
Advertisement, Boston Directory, 1848

Between 1847 and 1852 Whipple and astronomer William Cranch Bond, director of the Harvard College Observatory, used Harvard's Great Refractor telescope to produce images of the moon that are remarkable in their clarity of detail and aesthetic power. This was the largest telescope in the world at that time, and their images of the moon took the prize for technical excellence in photography at the great 1851 Crystal Palace Exhibition in London.

On the night of July 16–17, 1850, Whipple and Bond made the first daguerreotype of a star (Vega). In 1863, Whipple used electric lights to take night photographs of Boston Common.

Whipple was as prolific as an inventor as a photographer. He invented crayon daguerreotypes and crystallotypes (daguerreotypes on glass). With his partner or assistant, William Breed Jones, he developed the process for making paper prints from glass albumen negatives (crystallotypes). His American patents include Patent Number 6,056, the "Crayon Daguerreotype"; Patent Number 7,458, the "Crystallotype" (Credit shared with William B. Jones).

Whipple died suddenly, of pneumonia, on April 10, 1891, in Cambridge, Massachusetts, and was buried at Westborough, Worcester Co., Massachusetts.

== Image gallery ==
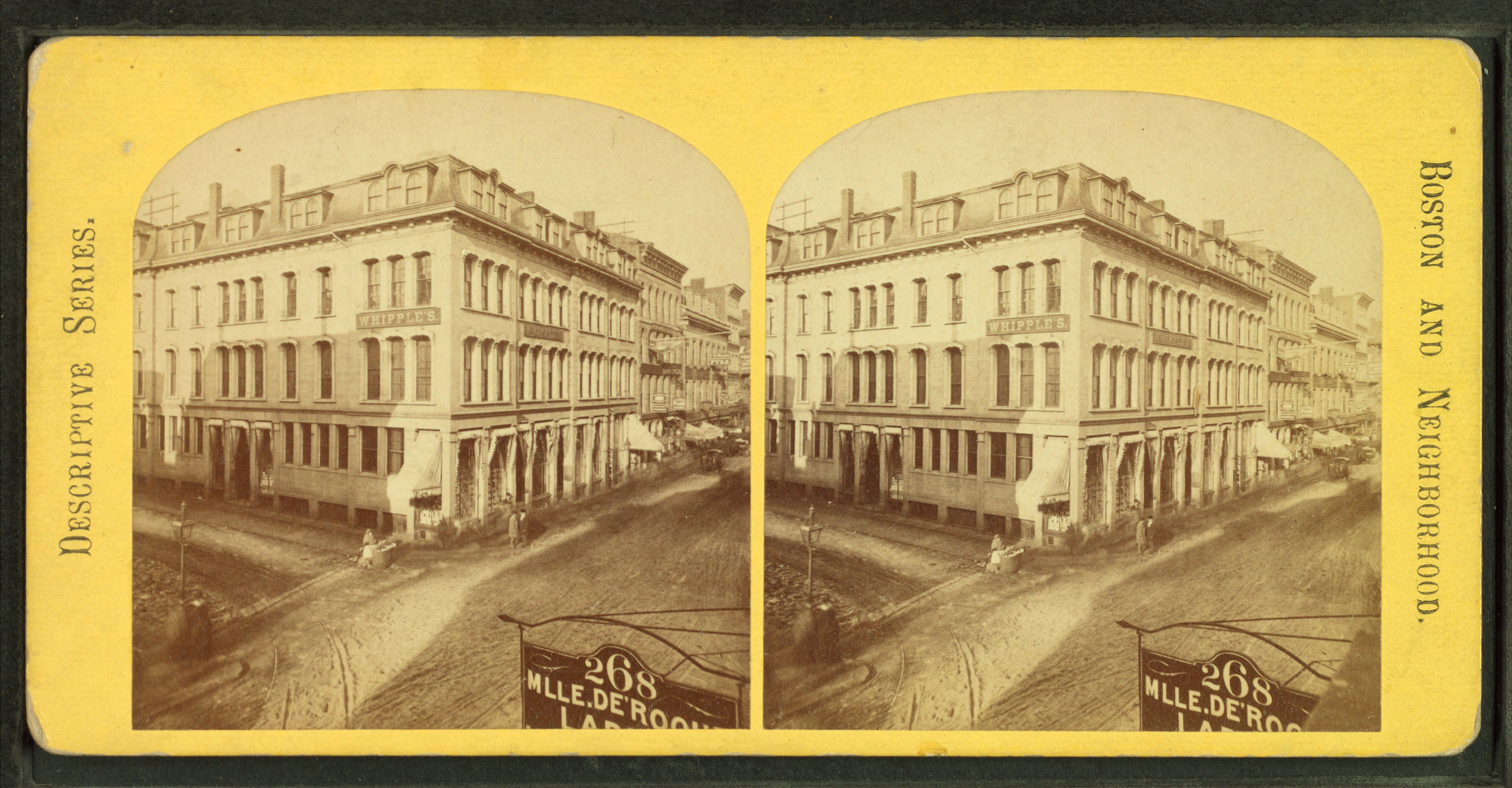
Whipple's studio, corner of Washington and Temple Streets, Boston

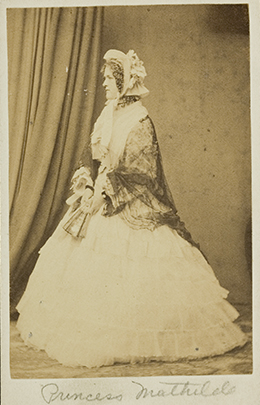
Mathilde Bonaparte, c. 1860s

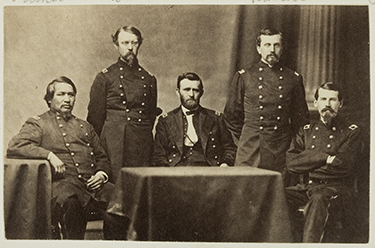
General Ulysses S. Grant (seated at center) and staff: Ely S. Parker, Adam Badeau, Orville E. Babcock, Horace Porter

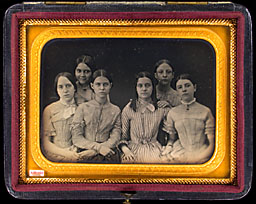
Unidentified girls, 19th century

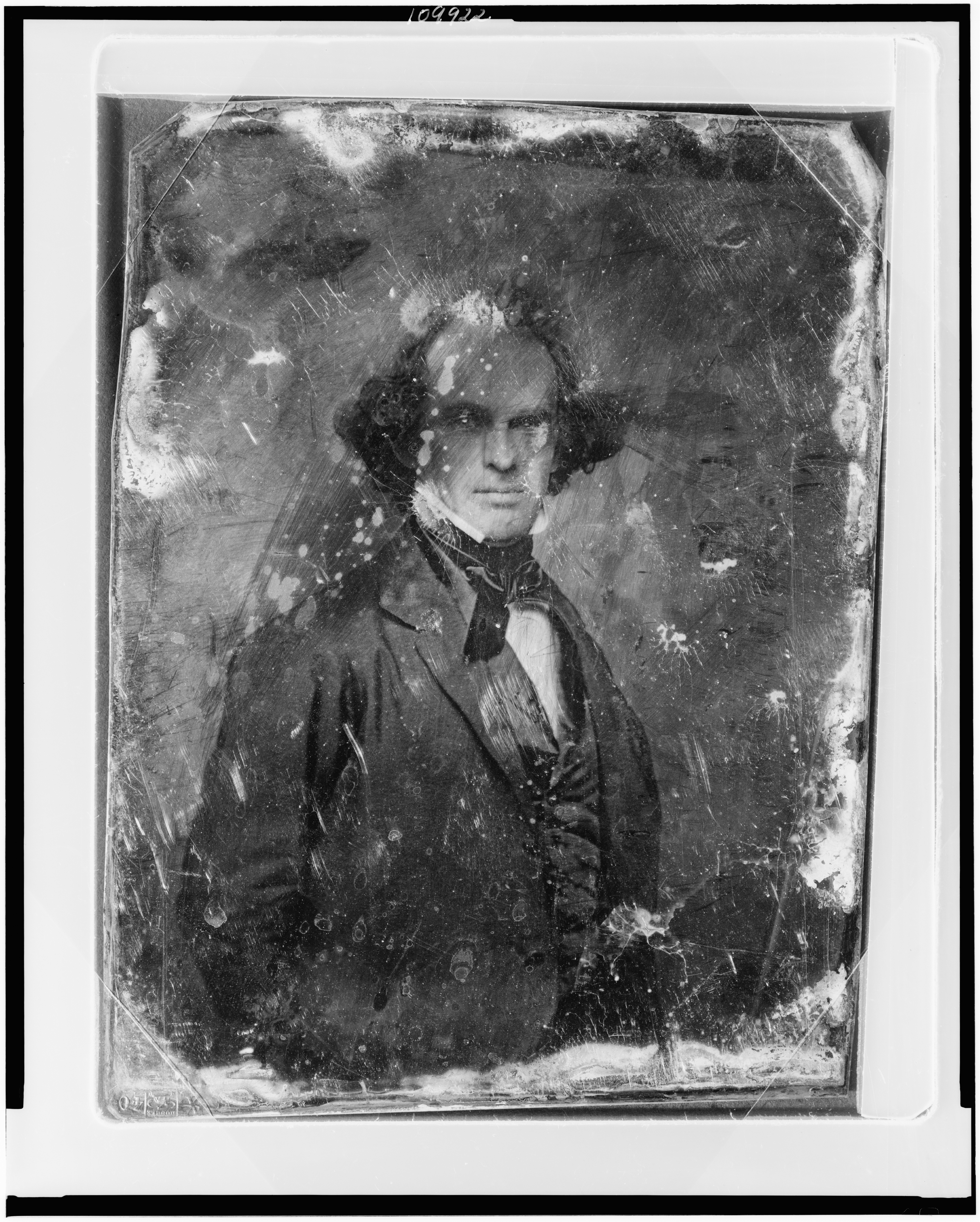
Nathaniel Hawthorne, c. 1850–1855

Partial solar eclipse, by Whipple, 1851

== Collections of his works ==
- Boston Athenaeum
- Boston Public Library
- George Eastman House
- Harvard University
- Historic New England
- Massachusetts Historical Society
- Metropolitan Museum of Art
- Smithsonian American Art Museum
