= Calibrator star =

Star that is typically used tor calibration purposes

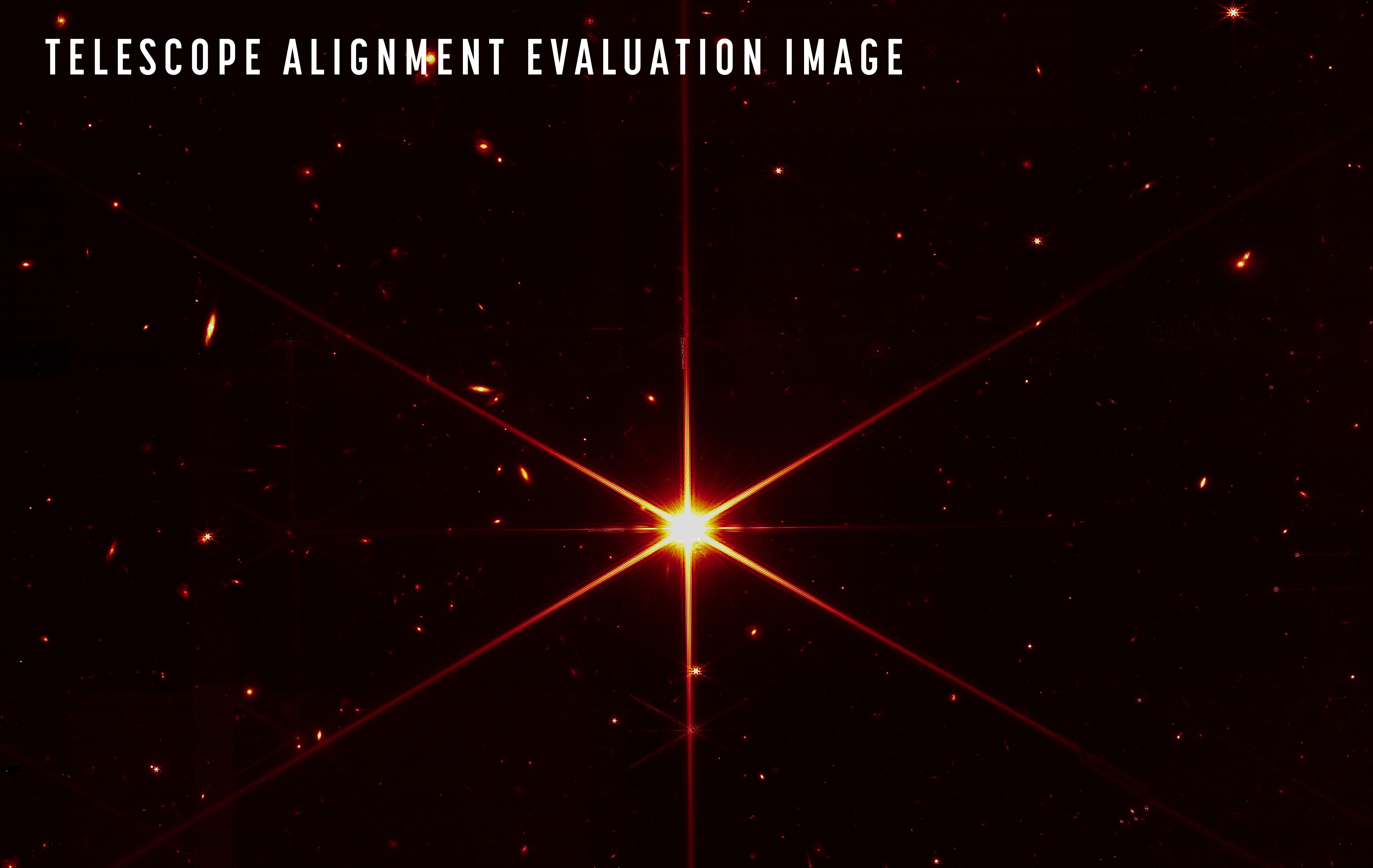
The star 2MASS J17554042+6551277, which was used as a calibrator star by the James Webb Space Telescope

A calibrator star is a star that is typically used for calibration purposes on high-sensitivity sensors located on space telescopes.

Calibrator stars do not usually follow specific criteria, but are normally hand-picked for different reasons.

== Definition ==
Infrared and optically bright stars may be observed for calibration purposes by satellites, particularly those with sensitivity to both infrared and visible radiation. The stars chosen generally meet the following criteria: they have a visual magnitude that is equal to or less than +6, and an IR brightness (in the 1-5 micrometer range) greater than that of Vega.

The stars are strictly southern objects (i.e., their declinations are negative), and most are cool stars of spectral classes K and M. While these are not the only stars that might serve for these purposes, they are well distributed across the southern sky and some should be visible at all times.

== List ==
Name	Image	Telescope used	Date	Reference
HD 96755		Hubble Space Telescope	May 1990	
TrES-2		Kepler Space Telescope	2008	
R Doradus		Transiting Exoplanet Survey Satellite	August 7, 2018	
2MASS J17554042+6551277		James Webb Space Telescope	July 12, 2022	

== Catalog ==
A catalog of recommended calibrator stars does exist, with 1,510 stars being listed. The catalog gives the magnitude, mass and other statistics.

== See also ==
- Lists of stars
- First light (astronomy)
