= David Ciardi =

American astronomer

David Robert Ciardi
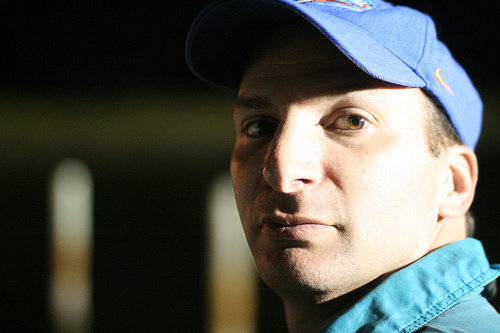
- Ciardi at 2009 Kepler Launch
- Born: 17 July 1969 (age 57)
- Education: University of Wyoming, Boston University
- Known for: Exoplanet science, infrared instrumentation and observations
- Scientific career
- Fields: Astrophysics
- Workplaces: Caltech, University of Florida
- Thesis: Star Formation in the Filamentary Dark Cloud GF-9: a Multi-Wavelength Intra-Cloud Comparative Study (1997)
- Doctoral advisor: Charles E. (Chick) Woodward

David Robert Ciardi (born 17 July 1969) is an American astronomer. He received a bachelor's degree in physics and astronomy from Boston University in 1991, and a Ph.D. in physics from the University of Wyoming in 1997.

== Career ==
Ciardi has published refereed journal articles across a wide range of topics, including exoplanets, star formation, interstellar dust, molecular clouds, and evolved stars. His observations of Vega using long-baseline interferometry with the Palomar Testbed Interferometer were the first to spatially resolve the debris disk around this star and to show that dust was present within 1 AU of the star - akin to the interplanetary dust in the Solar System that produces the zodiacal light. This work led to the discovery of dust in the inner regions around other stars and leading to the discovery of a gap between the inner dust ring and the outer dust ring in many systems - the existence of which is still not understood. Ciardi is a member of the Kepler Science Team and using data from the Kepler space telescope mission, Ciardi has published landmark works on the fundamental nature of stellar variability and the relative sizes of planets in multi-planet systems and has contributed to more than 250 exoplanet discovery papers, including many of the Kepler Mission discoveries and being the principal investigator of the Palomar Transient Factory Orion Transit Survey and co-discoverer of the first transiting planet around a newly formed T Tauri star in the 3-million-year-old star cluster surrounding 25 Orionis.

Ciardi completed his PhD at the University of Wyoming in 1997, and remained in Laramie for another year as a post-doctoral fellow. He left Wyoming to become a post-doc at the University of Florida, ostensibly to work on the Wide Field Infrared Explorer (WIRE) mission. The unfortunate failure of WIRE's main telescope immediately following launch sidetracked that research path; however, Ciardi remained at Florida and became a staff member with the infrared instrumentation group where he worked on an array of infrared instruments, including T-ReCS for the 8m telescope Gemini South and CanariCam for the 10m Gran Telescopio Canarias. In 2002, Ciardi took a staff astronomer position at the NASA Exoplanet Science Institute; he served as the NExScI Chief Scientist from 2017-2024, the Deputy Director from 2024-2025, and is currently the NExScI Acting Executive Director and is a Member of the Professional Staff at Caltech.

== Awards and honors ==
In 2016, Ciardi was awarded the NASA Exceptional Scientific Achievement Medal for his work on Kepler and his contributions to the confirmation of Kepler's exoplanets which have led to the characterization of planets ranging in size from Jupiters to Earths. The NASA Exceptional Scientific Achievement Medal is awarded to individuals for unusually significant scientific contributions toward achievement of aeronautical or space exploration goals. Asteroid 26312 Ciardi was named in his honor. The official naming citation was published by the Minor Planet Center on 18 May 2019 (M.P.C. 114954). In September 2019, Ciardi, as part of the TESS team, was awarded the NASA Silver Achievement Medal.

== Academic lineage ==
The following is the historic path of Ciardi's advisors - otherwise known as his academic lineage - spanning two centuries of scientific achievement.

Scientist	Year of Ph.D.	Institution
Charles Woodward	1987	University of Rochester
Judy Pipher	1971	Cornell University
Martin Harwit	1960	MIT
William Allis	1925	University of Nancy
