= Giuseppe Calandrelli =

Italian astronomer (1749–1827)

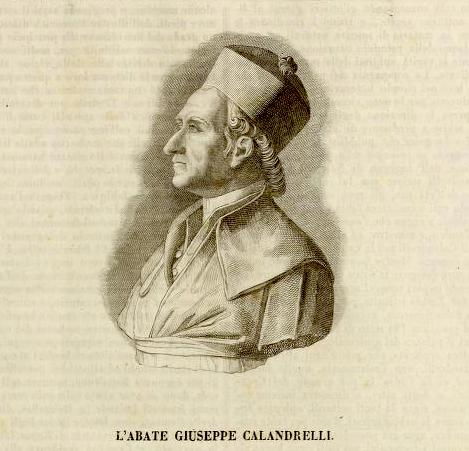
- Posthumous sketch of Calamdrelli, 1845
- Born: 22 May 1749; Zagarolo, Italy
- Died: 24 December 1827 (aged 78)
- Occupations: priest; astronomer; mathematician
- Relatives: Ignazio Calandrelli (nephew)

Giuseppe Calandrelli (22 May 1749 – 24 December 1827) was an Italian priest, astronomer and mathematician. He founded the first astronomical observatory in the Collegio Romano in 1787. An uncle of the astronomer Ignazio Calandrelli, he was among the first to observe the parallax of stars, estimate the masses of comets, the potential size of their atmosphere, and to examine the use of barometers to mathematically estimate altitudes.

== Biography ==
Calandrelli was born at Zagarolo, near Rome, son of Tommasso and Maria Fortini. He studied philosophy and theology at Vatican and Albano and was ordained priest in 1768 under Cardinal Flavio Chigi. He taught at the Magliano Sabina seminary from 1769. In 1773 the Society of Jesus was suppressed by Pope Clement XIV and Calandrelli was posted as a professor of mathematics at the Collegio Romano. With support of Cardinal Francesco Saverio de Zelada (1717–1801) who trained him at his own private observatory, he tried to set up an observatory at the Torre dei Venti, Vatican. Along with Ruggero Boscovich another observatory was considered at the Collegio Romano on the rooftop of the Church of St. Ignazio but found to be too expensive.

After Boscovich's death, Calandrelli, with the help of Cardinal Zelada established a 67-meter observation tower in 1787 from which he examined the positions of stars and planets. He obtained instruments from Paris with support from Pope Pius VII. He collaborated with Andrea Conti (1777–1840) and Giacomo Ricchebach (1776–1841) and published his observations in the Opuscoli Astronomici (1803–1824). The observatory, known as the Calandrelli Tower, was later expanded by Angelo Secchi.

Calandrelli examined the idea of the cometary tail being made of something like smoke rising and the other that it was repelled by the sun. Calandrelli favoured the repulsion theory and assumed that all the cometary material including its vapour are attracted to the centre of the comet. He attempted to estimate the mass of the comet of 1807 using estimates of velocities. He also corresponded with the mathematicians D'Alembert and others and commented in 1778 on relationships involving imaginary numbers (particularly Euler's identity).

Calandrelli noted stellar parallax in 1805-6 and came up with a 4-second value for the star Vega which was a gross overestimate. He calculated the latitude of the observatory with precision and was involved in a historical examination of the Gregorian calendar. In 1815 Calandrelli was relieved from his teaching duties and he was fully involved in his studies and retired in 1824 to the seminary of Saint Apollinaire where he died and was buried in the church cemetery.
