= Ignazio Calandrelli =

Italian astronomer (1792–1866)

Ignazio Calandrelli (22 November 1792 – 12 February 1866) was an Italian priest and observational astronomer. He was the nephew of Giuseppe Calandrelli. His main work was in the observations and examinations of the movements of planets and comets.

Calandrelli was born in Rome to Carlo and Margarita Girella and was the nephew of the astronomer Giuseppe Calandrelli. He studied theology and joined the Gregorian University, receiving a degree in philosophy in 1814 when he became a student of his uncle at the Collegio Romano observatory. He was then appointed professor of elementary mathematics and then taught at the Saint Apollinare seminary. In 1838 he became professor of optics and astronomy at Rome and in 1845 took charge of the Bologna Observatory. In 1848 he became director of the Campidoglio observatory. A Merz achromatic telescope (11.4–cm [9”] aperture, 190–cm focal length) was donated to the observatory by Marquis Giuseppe Ferrajoli (1798–1870) in 1869. He published observations on the movements of planets and comets in the proceedings of the Accademia dei Nuovi Lincei. Otto Wilhelm Struve was critical of the work at the Campidoglio observatory, claiming that work was done only when something caught the fancy of the director Calandrelli.
