= Palomar Testbed Interferometer =

Astronomical instrument in California

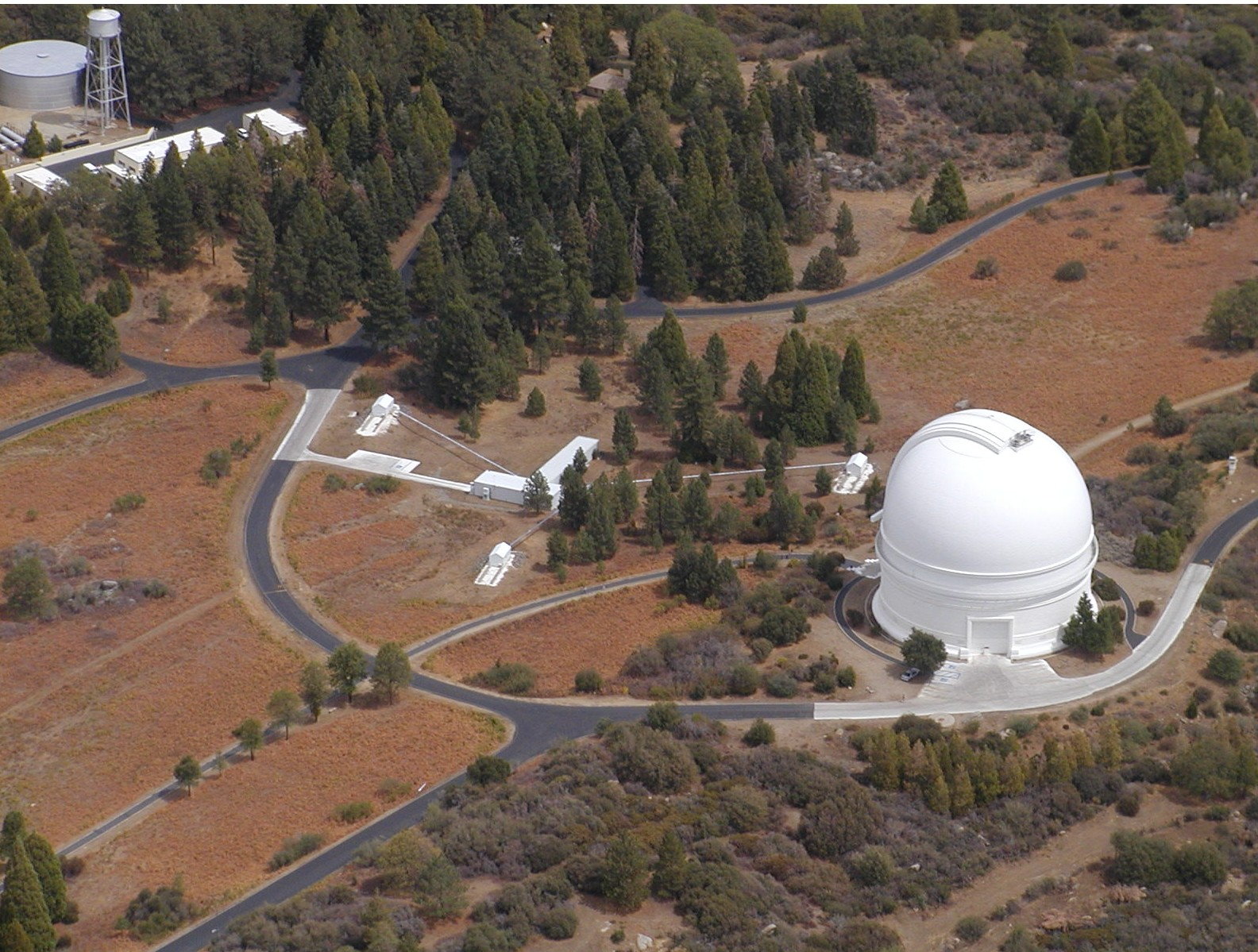
- PTI on Palomar Mountain, next to the Hale Telescope
- Location(s): San Diego County, California, Pacific States Region
- Coordinates: 33°21′26″N 116°51′50″W
- Diameter: 0.4 m (1 ft 4 in)
- Location of Palomar Testbed Interferometer

The Palomar Testbed Interferometer (PTI) was a near infrared, long-baseline stellar interferometer located at Palomar Observatory in north San Diego County, California, United States. It was built by Caltech and the Jet Propulsion Laboratory and was intended to serve as a testbed for developing interferometric techniques to be used at the Keck Interferometer. It began operations in 1995 and achieved routine operations in 1998, producing more than 50 refereed papers in a variety of scientific journals covering topics from high precision astrometry to stellar masses, stellar diameters and shapes. PTI concluded operations in 2008 and has since been dismantled.

PTI was notable for being equipped with a "dual-star" system, making it possible to simultaneously observe pairs of stars; this cancels some of the atmospheric effects of astronomical seeing and makes very high precision measurements possible.

A groundbreaking study with the Palomar Testbed Interferometer revealed that the star Altair is not spherical, but is rather flattened at the poles due to its high rate of rotation.

== See also ==
- List of astronomical interferometers at visible and infrared wavelengths
- List of observatories
