= California Science Center =

Science museum in Los Angeles, California

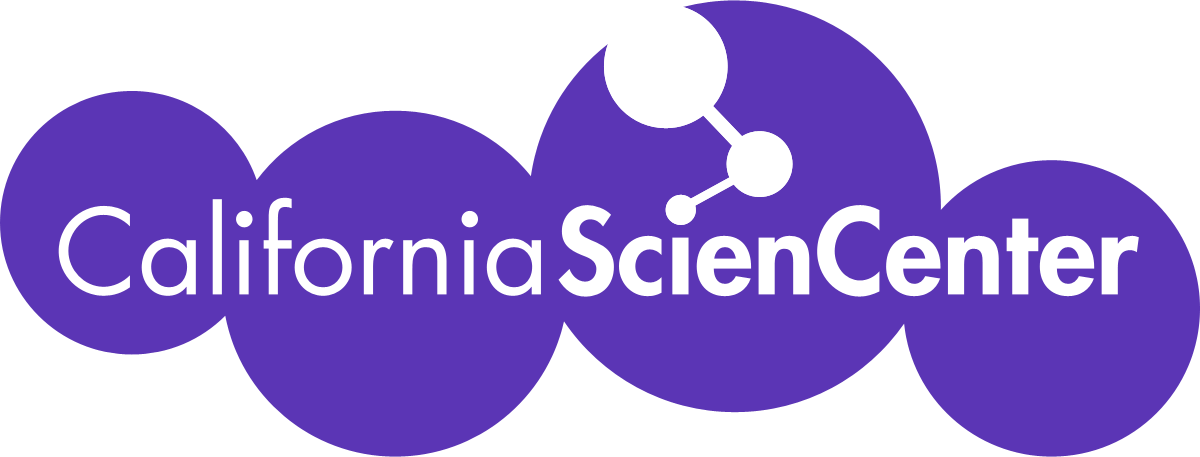

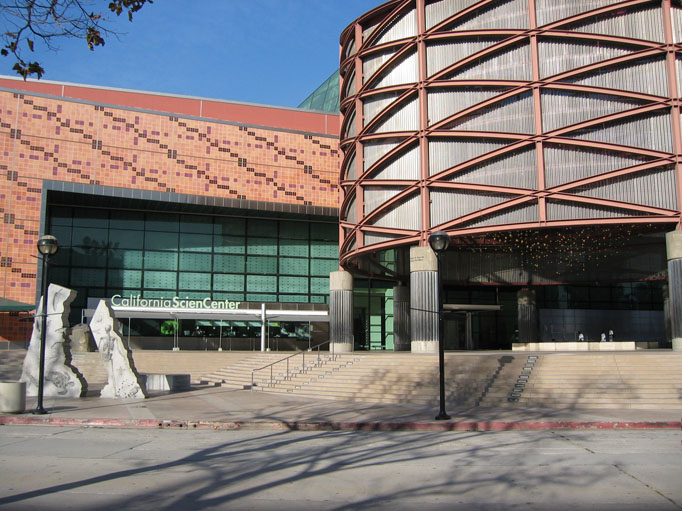
- Established: 1951; 75 years ago (as California Museum of Science and Industry); 1998; 28 years ago (as California Science Center)
- Location: Exposition Park, Los Angeles, California, U.S.
- Coordinates: 34°0′56″N 118°17′9″W
- Type: Science museum
- Accreditation: AAM, ASTC, AZA
- Visitors: 1,694,000 (2022)
- Public transit access: Expo Park/USC
- Website: californiasciencecenter.org

The California Science Center (sometimes spelled California ScienCenter) is a state agency and science museum located in Exposition Park, Los Angeles, next to the Natural History Museum of Los Angeles County and the University of Southern California. The museum includes many exhibits of aircraft and spacecraft, including Space Shuttle Endeavour, multiple hands-on galleries, special exhibitions, and IMAX movies.

Billed as the West Coast's largest hands-on science center, this museum is a public-private partnership between the State of California and the California Science Center Foundation. The California Natural Resources Agency oversees the California Science Center and the California African American Museum. Founded in 1951 as the "California Museum of Science and Industry", the Museum was remodeled and renamed in 1998 as the "California Science Center," which hosts the California State Science Fair annually.

== History ==
=== State Exhibition ===
The museum's history dates back to the first California State Exhibition building, which opened in Exposition Park in Los Angeles in 1912, the site of an agricultural fairground from 1872 to 1910. The brick and terra cotta building, designed by William D. Coates, Jr., state architect, and N. Ellery, state engineer, displayed agriculturally-based natural resources and industrial products from across the state, including ranching, fish and game, coal mining, gold mining, oil production, and lumbering, as well as some of the state's recreational attractions. After World War II, the building also featured exhibits about state science and technology industries.

=== California Museum of Science and Industry ===
In 1951, the exhibition became the "California Museum of Science and Industry". The State Exhibition building was renamed in honor of major donor and trustee Howard F. Ahmanson as the Howard F. Ahmanson Building. The hands-on interactive exhibits included themes on agriculture, transportation, electricity, energy, industries, and minerals.

In 1961, the museum opened a new science wing that featured "Mathematica: A World of Numbers... and Beyond", an exhibit sponsored by IBM and designed by Charles and Ray Eames to visually demonstrate fundamental mathematical concepts. Interaction stations demonstrated different concepts including celestial mechanics, the Möbius strip, multiplication, symmetry, and projective geometry. The original exhibit closed in 1998, and is now on display at the New York Hall of Science. The Hall of Health was added in 1968.

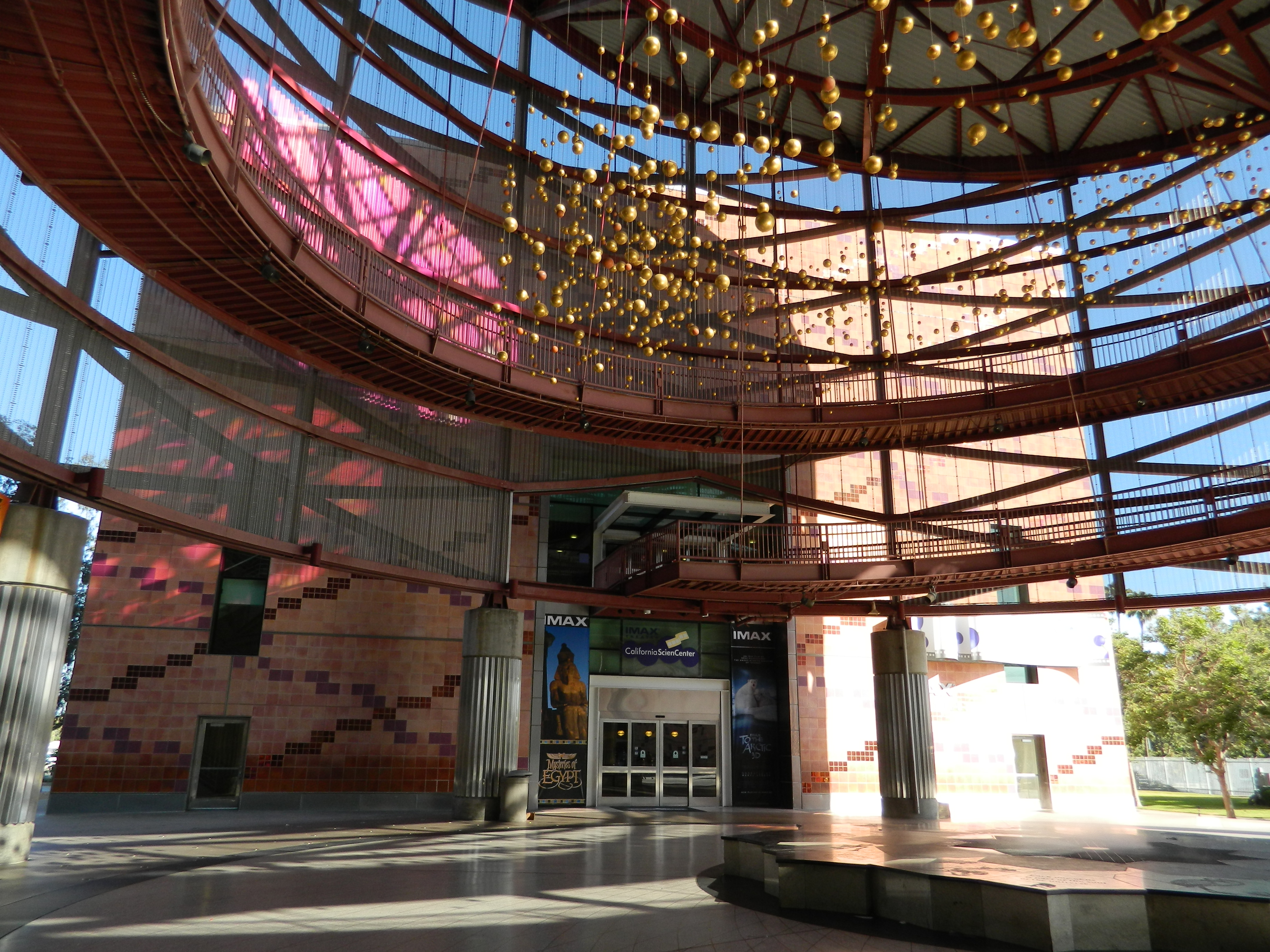
IMAX Theater entrance.

In preparation for the 1984 Summer Olympics, the museum added new exhibits on earthquakes and economics, and an IMAX theater. The opening and closing ceremonies for the games were held in the Los Angeles Memorial Coliseum, which is adjacent to the museum.

In 1994, the museum's building was damaged by the Northridge earthquake. The California Museum of Science and Industry closed in 1996 to prepare for a new facility.

==== California African American Museum ====
The California African American Museum was founded in 1981, and housed in the California Museum of Science and Industry building until 1984, when its own facility was opened adjacent to the California Aerospace Museum.

=== California Aerospace Museum ===
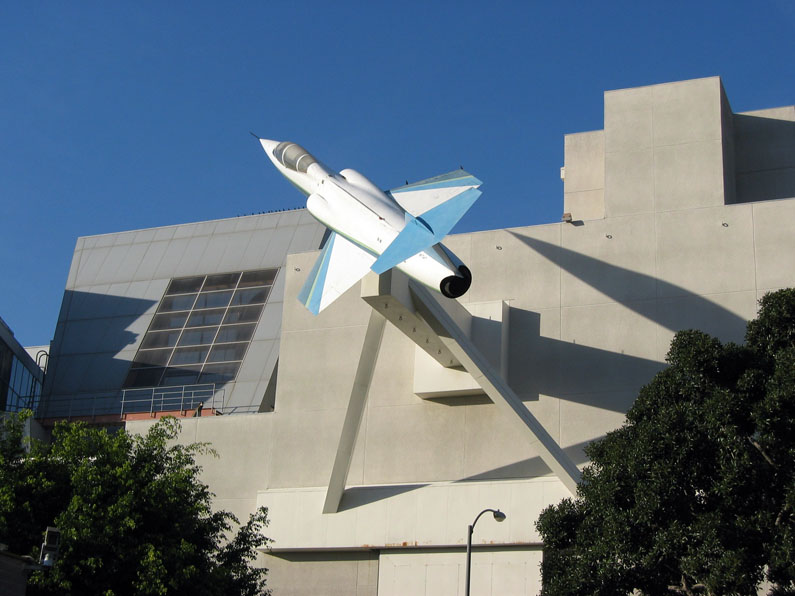
Former California Aerospace Museum (now closed) was designed by Frank Gehry, and displayed a Lockheed F-104 Starfighter

The "California Aerospace Museum" was also opened in 1984 adjacent to and operated by the California Museum of Science and Industry to coincide with the Summer Olympics. It was also known as Aerospace Hall but also commonly known as the California Air and Space Museum/Gallery and the SKETCH Foundation Gallery, and was the first major public work of architect Frank Gehry. The museum focused on the State's history as a leader in the aviation and aerospace industries and featured a giant, hangar-like space with aircraft and space vehicles and artifacts. The building, now known as the Air and Space Gallery, was closed in 2011. In 2012 the building was listed on the California Register of Historical Resources, but its future is unknown.

=== Transformation to the California Science Center ===
In 1988 the museum's leadership began to develop a three-phase, 25-year master plan to transform the institution from a science museum to a science education facility. This new facility would be known as the California Science Center. The original museum building closed its doors in 1996 to prepare for the new construction, which was designed by Portland, Oregon-based Zimmer Gunsul Frasca Partnership. The original main building (Howard F. Ahmanson building) was redesigned, which the north facade of the Science Center retains the facade of former State Exposition Building that opened to the Exposition Park Rose Garden. However, the remainder of the original building was demolished. When Phase I was completed, the museum was officially renamed as the California Science Center, and was open to the public in 1998.

==== Phase I ====
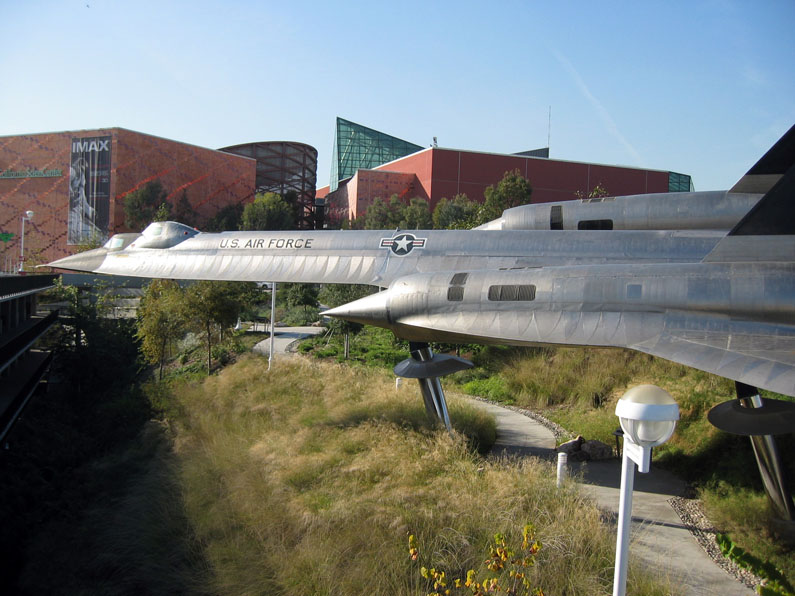
Lockheed A-12 "Archangel," nicknamed "Titanium Goose," on display outside the California Science Center

The grand opening of the new California Science Center, which includes:

- Science Plaza - Exhibits outside the main entrance of aircraft and science principles.
- Exhibits inside the new building
  - World of Life - Explores the science of life in five galleries.
  - Creative World - Highlights technology in transportation, communications and structures. Features include a virtual reality exhibit to play sports using virtual reality and an earthquake simulator.
  - Special Exhibits gallery - Exhibits in this room have included a Titanic exhibit, a magic exhibit, a toy exhibit, and the Human Body exhibit.
  - ExploraStore - Store specializing in scientific and educational items.
- A new seven-story IMAX theater

==== Phase II ====
The new Ecosystems exhibit opened in 2010, allow guests to experience first-hand of the natural world. Other changes included:

- Renovated the historic Wallis Annenberg Building building into a new "Building for Science Learning and Innovation", opened in 2004 The building includes the Amgen Center for Science Learning and the K-5 Science Center School, a public magnet school officially known as the Dr. Theodore T. Alexander Jr. Science Center School.
- SKETCH Foundation Gallery, Air and Space Exhibits - opened in 2002, a temporary gallery featuring interactive exhibits and artifacts on continuing loan from NASA and The Smithsonian Institution.
- Air and Space Gallery (former California Aerospace Museum) closed in 2011, with displays moved into the main Science Center in the SKETCH Foundation Gallery.

==== Phase III ====
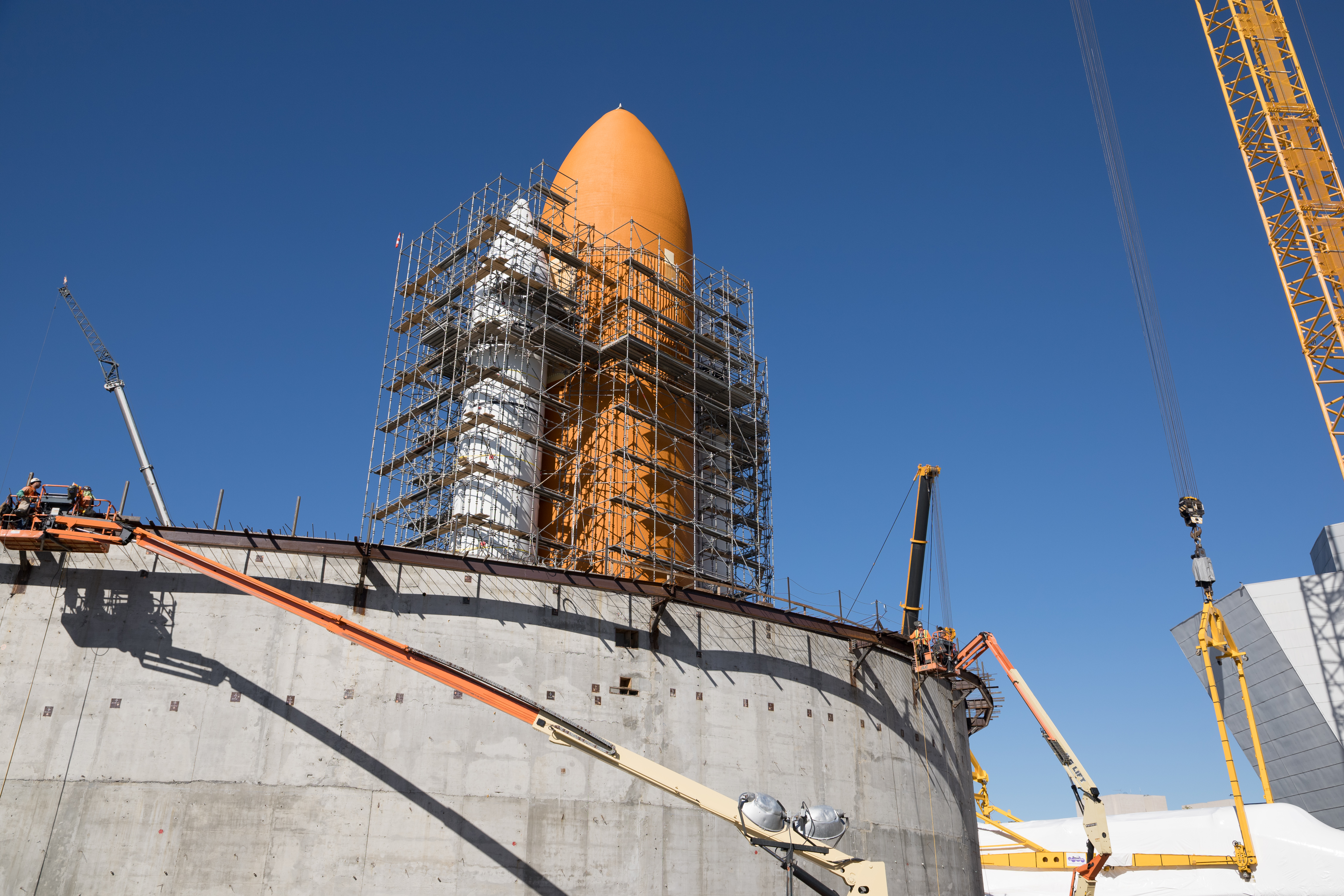
Construction of a viewing gallery around Space Shuttle Endeavour, its external tank, and solid rocket boosters at Samuel Oschin Air and Space Center.

On April 12, 2011, NASA announced the California Science Center would receive the Space Shuttle Endeavour. It arrived at the Science Center on October 14, 2012, after it made its journey through the streets of Los Angeles. Before its arrival, a building was constructed to temporarily house the Space Shuttle. It was on display in the "Samuel Oschin Pavilion" until December 31, 2023. This structure was designed by ZGF Architects and is planned to be replaced with the new Samuel Oschin Air and Space Center on the east side of the Science Center.

With a projected cost of $425 million, the Samuel Oschin Air and Space Center broke ground on June 1, 2022. The new 200,000-square-foot (19,000 m^{2}) addition was formerly titled "Worlds Beyond". The new building was designed by ZGF Architects as an addition to the main science center. Construction work is scheduled to be completed in mid-2025 and will take several more years to install the artifacts and exhibits inside the building. It was open to the public on November 13, 2026.

== Permanent exhibits ==
General Admission for the California Science Center is free for their permanent exhibition galleries, various demonstrations, and other prominent aircraft and spacecraft. There are price charges for special exhibitions, educated films shown in their IMAX theater, and special activities that include a climbing wall, a motion simulator, and a high-wire bicycle.

=== Current exhibits ===
==== World of Life ====
This exhibit examines the processes of life and similarities among other microscopic organisms. It is also home to BodyWorks, a 15-minute show featuring Tess, a 50-foot animatronic human body simulator, with her animated friend, Walt, demonstrating how homeostasis works.

==== Ecosystems ====
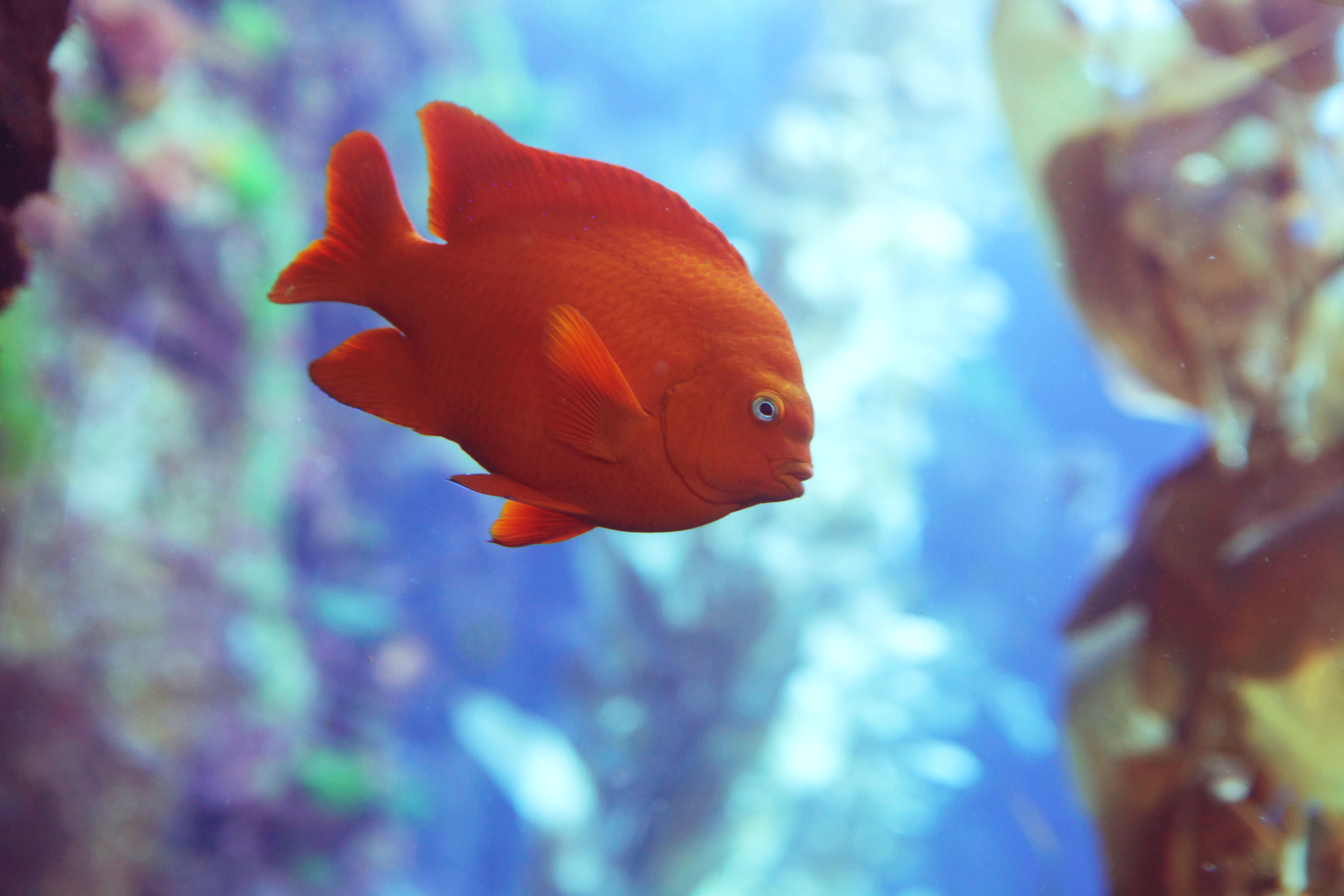
California Garibaldi State Fish in an aquarium.

This two-story, 45,000-square-foot exhibit features display zones with live animals and aquariums about wildlife and adaptation in different ecosystems, including a river, desert, polar region, deep sea, ocean, island and urban areas, as well as the entire planet Earth, including a 188,000-gallon kelp tank populated with more than 1,500 live fish, kelp and other marine life with an acrylic tunnel which allows guests to feel surrounded by the sea life.

==== Fire! Science & Safety ====
This exhibit inside an Casa Del Fuego apartment building showcase the importance of fire safety, and raise awareness on what to do if ever a fire did occurs. It was developed in partnership with the Children's Burn Foundation.

==== Samuel Oschin Air and Space Center ====
The Samuel Oschin Air and Space Center is a new building next to the Science Center which will include three multi-level galleries, spanning four floors and covering over 100,000 square feet of exhibit space. It will also house special exhibits and events, including the Space Shuttle Endeavour. Endeavour will be in vertical launching position, meaning a height of 20 stories, the tallest of such displays in the world. A Boeing 747 and about 20 other aircraft will be included in the exhibition as well.

=== Former exhibits ===
==== Creative World ====
This exhibit examines the environment humans build to meet their needs for structures and transportation. It features an earthquake simulator shows the safety features used to construct the Science Center; and nearby hands-on exhibits demonstrate liquefaction and how reinforced vs. non-reinforced construction can determine the sturdiness of a structure.

== Collection ==
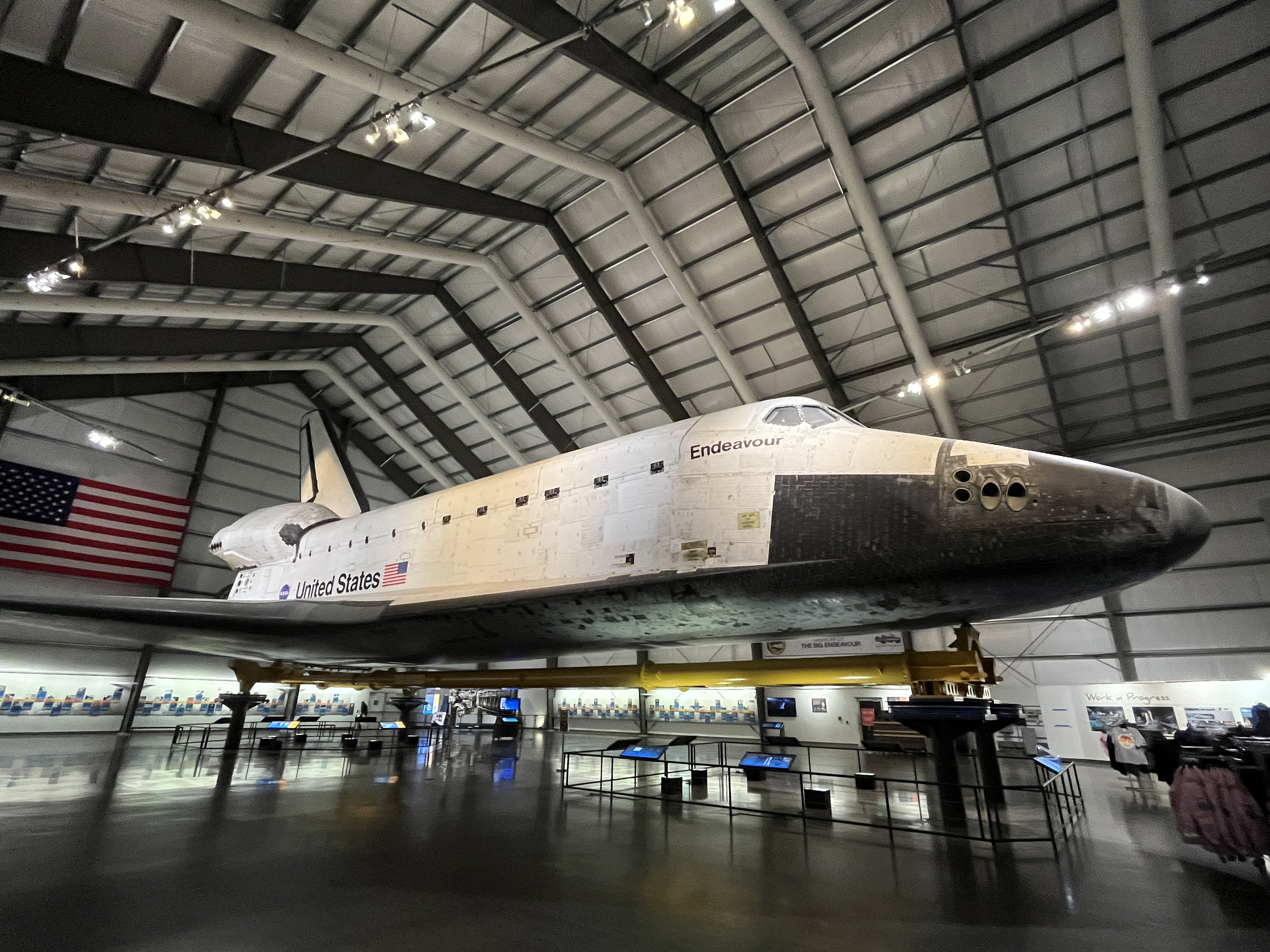
Space Shuttle Endeavour in the temporary Samuel Oschin Pavilion (Feb 2023)

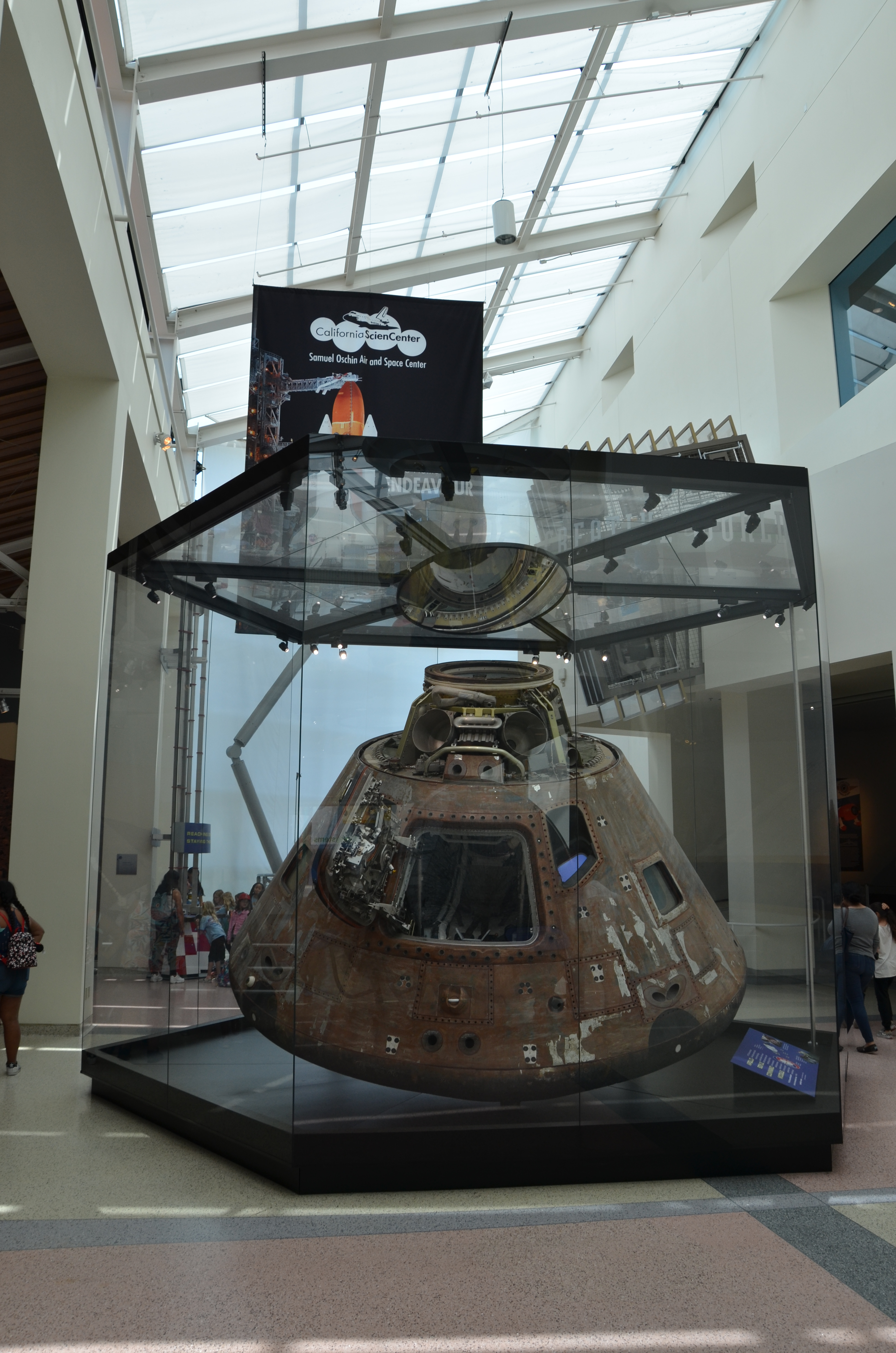
The Apollo command module from the 1975 Apollo–Soyuz Test Project displayed in the center's crewed spaceflight exhibit

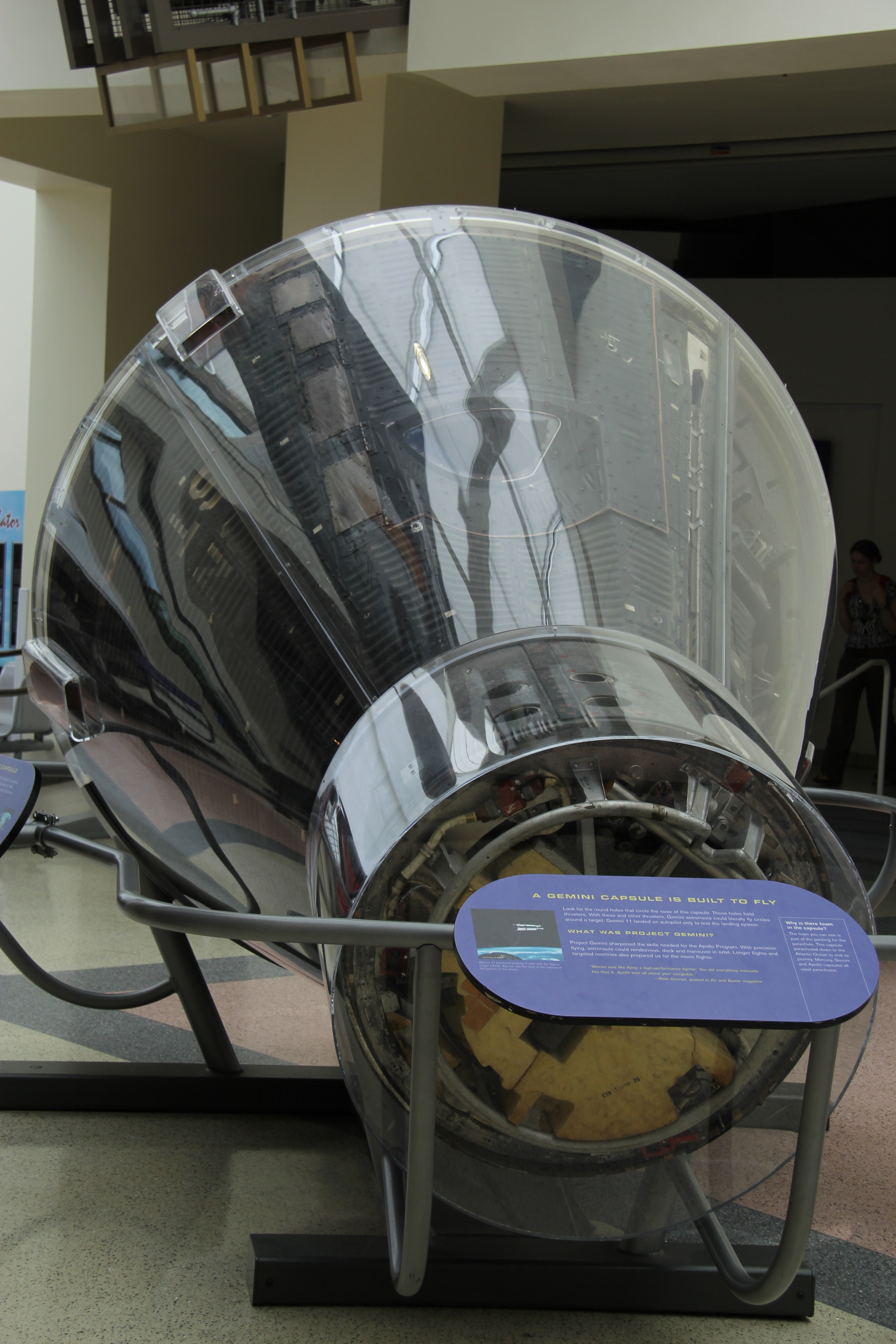
The Gemini 11 space capsule, flown in 1966

=== Spacecraft ===
- Mercury-Redstone 2 capsule which carried Ham, a chimpanzee, the first great ape in space (1961)
- Gemini 11 capsule, flown by Pete Conrad and Richard F. Gordon Jr. in 1966
- Apollo-Soyuz Test Project Command Module from the 1975 mission
- SpaceX Dragon C108 which reached orbit 3 times and spent nearly 99 days in space
- Rocket Lab Electron rocket was used to launch satellites into orbit and was the first to use 3D printed engines
- SKETCH Foundation Gallery in Science Court - exhibits about the Solar System, space travel and aviation, displays of historic aircraft, space vehicles and equipment, and space telescopes
- Space Shuttle Endeavour in a 20-story-tall display with an external fuel tank, and a pair of solid rocket boosters.

=== Aircraft ===
- Douglas DC-8 Jetliner
- Douglas DC-3 N760
- Boeing 747-400 Korean Airlines HL7489
- Lockheed F-104D Starfighter
- Lockheed A-12 Oxcart two-seater trainer, Serial Number 60-6927 “Titanium Goose”
- Replica Bell X-1 (movie prop from The Right Stuff)
- 1902 Wright Glider replica
- 1929 Velie Monocoupe
- Northrop T-38 Talon Jet Trainer, Serial Number 58-1196
- Northrop T-38 Talon Jet Trainer, Serial Number 59-1603
- Northrop F-20 Tigershark
- McDonnell Douglas F/A-18A Hornet Serial Number 161725
- Grumman F-11 Tiger Serial Number BuNo 138608
- Hawker Siddeley Harrier Jump Jet
- North American F-100 Super Sabre 54-2165
- Convair F-106 Delta Dart 58-0786
- de Havilland Vampire A79-618

=== Robotic spacecraft ===
- Engineering prototype for Viking Lander
- Cassini-Huygens planetary probe (replica)
- Pioneer 10 planetary probe (replica)
- Mariner IV planetary probe (replica)
- Pioneer-Venus planetary probe (replica)

== Attendance ==
The Center received 1,694,000 visitors in 2022, making the tenth most-visited museum in the United States.

== Affiliations ==
The center has been accredited by the American Alliance of Museums and the Association of Zoos and Aquariums, and is a member of the Association of Science and Technology Centers. The museum is also an affiliate in the Smithsonian Affiliations program.

== Gallery ==
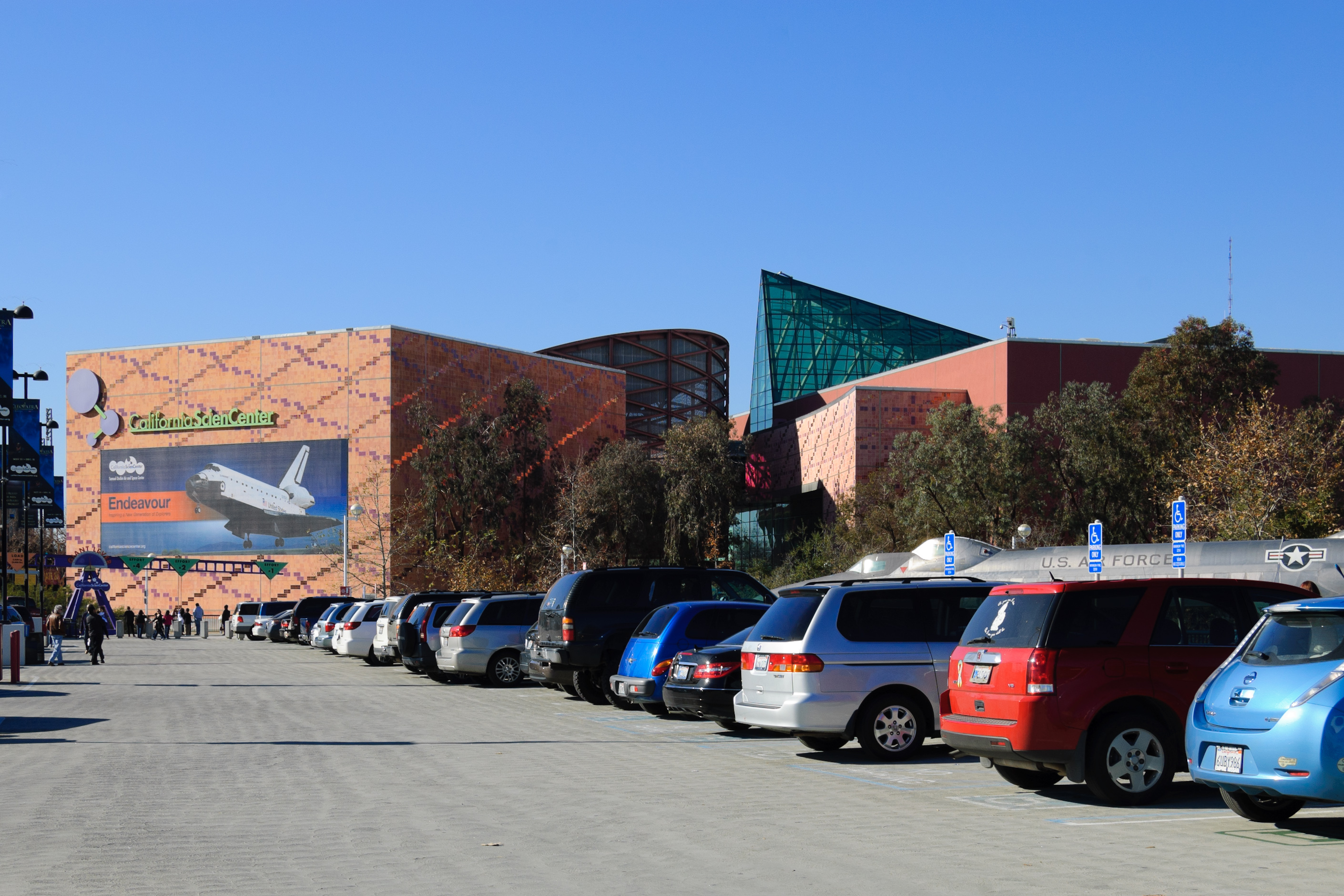
View of entire building.

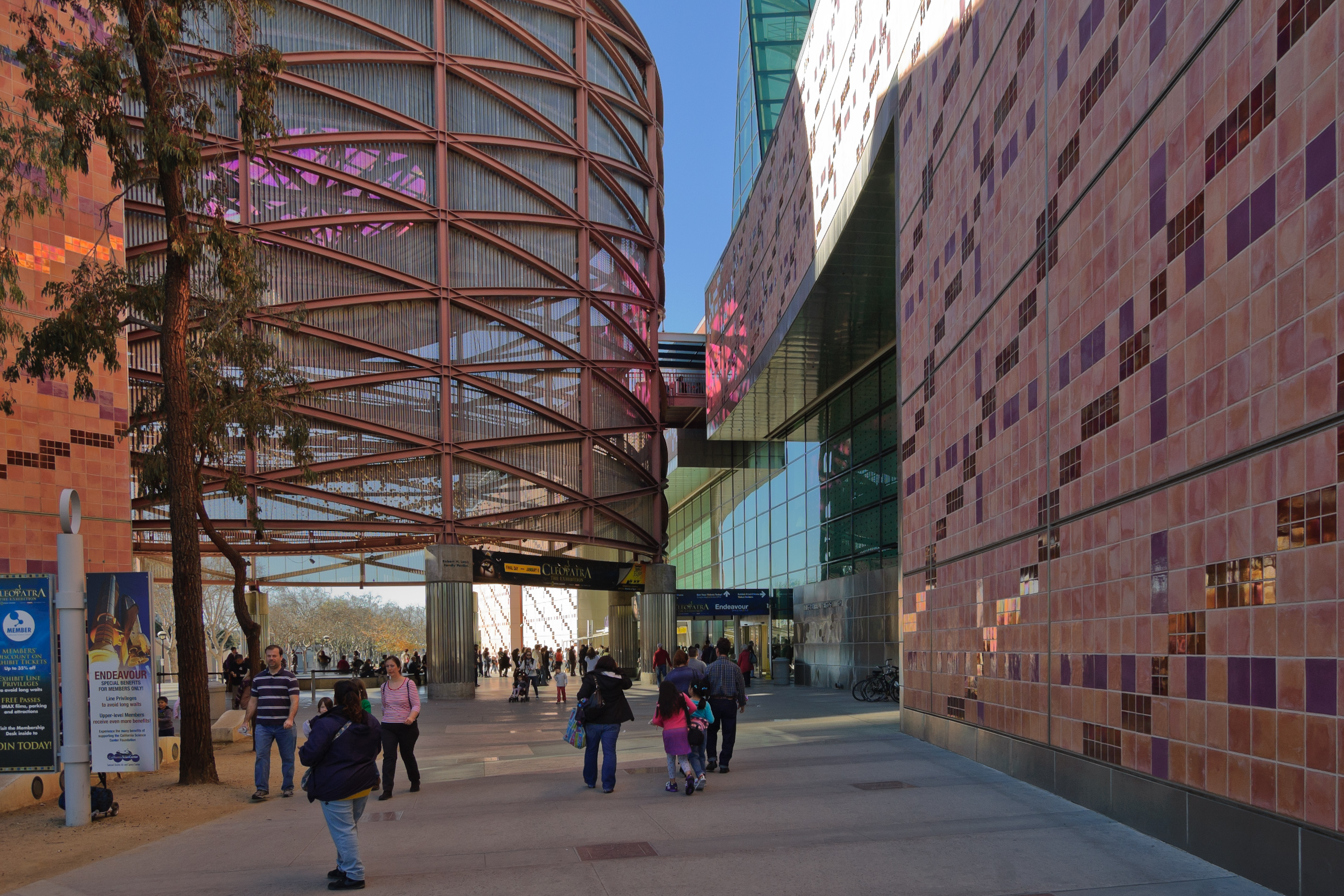
Entrance to CSC, with IMAX Theater at the left.

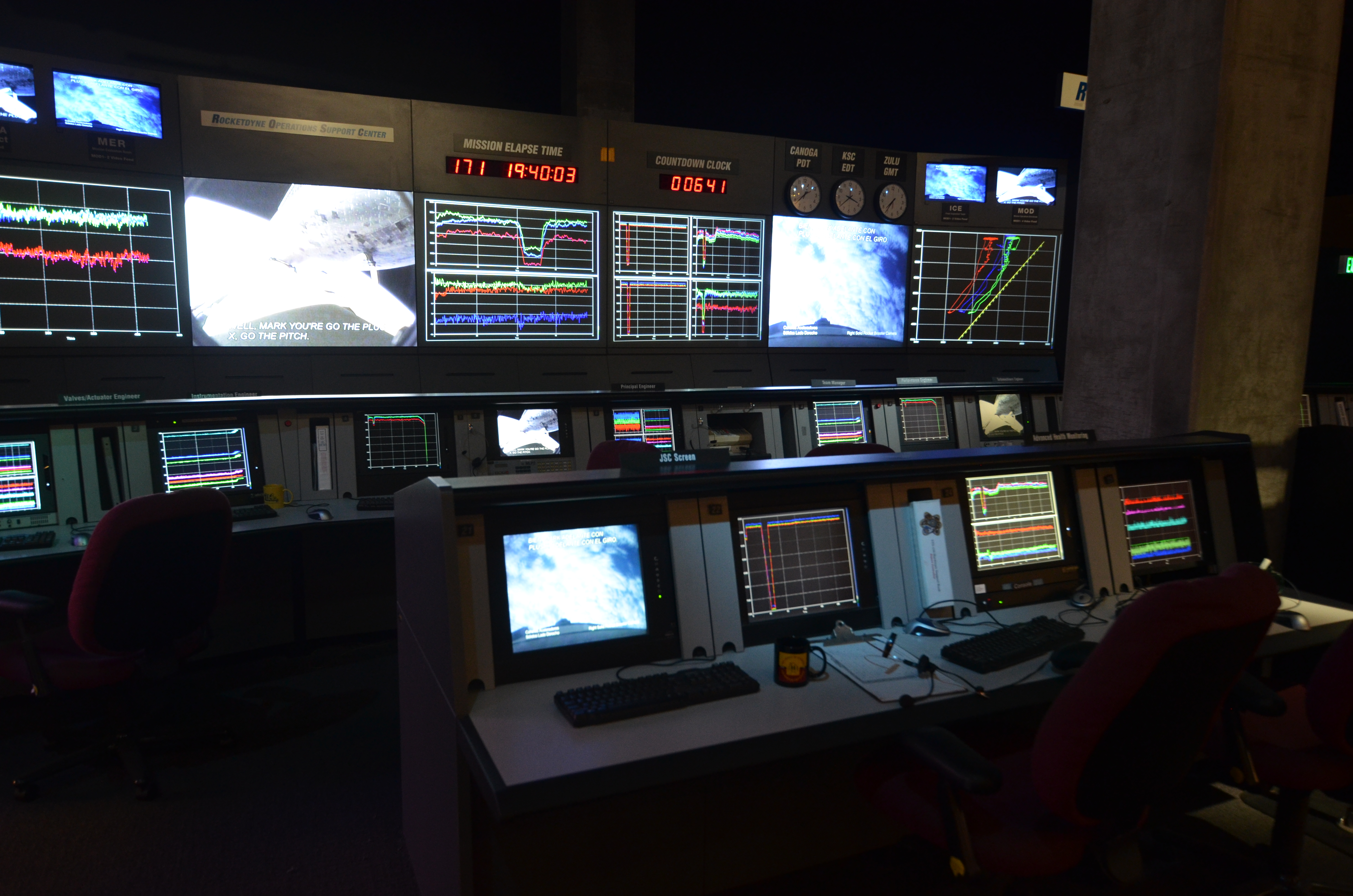
Rocketdyne Operations Support Centre exhibit.

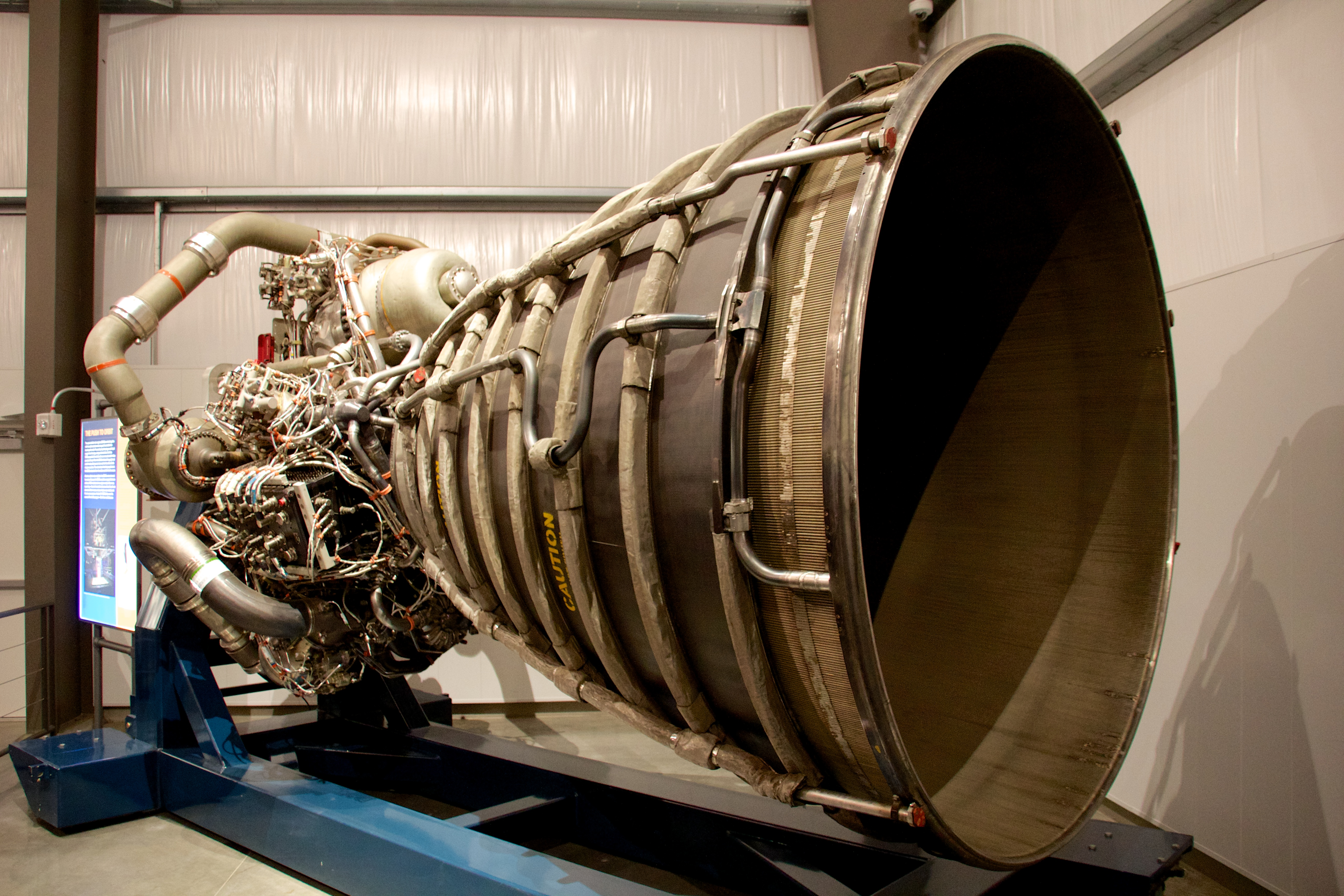
Space Shuttle main engine up close.

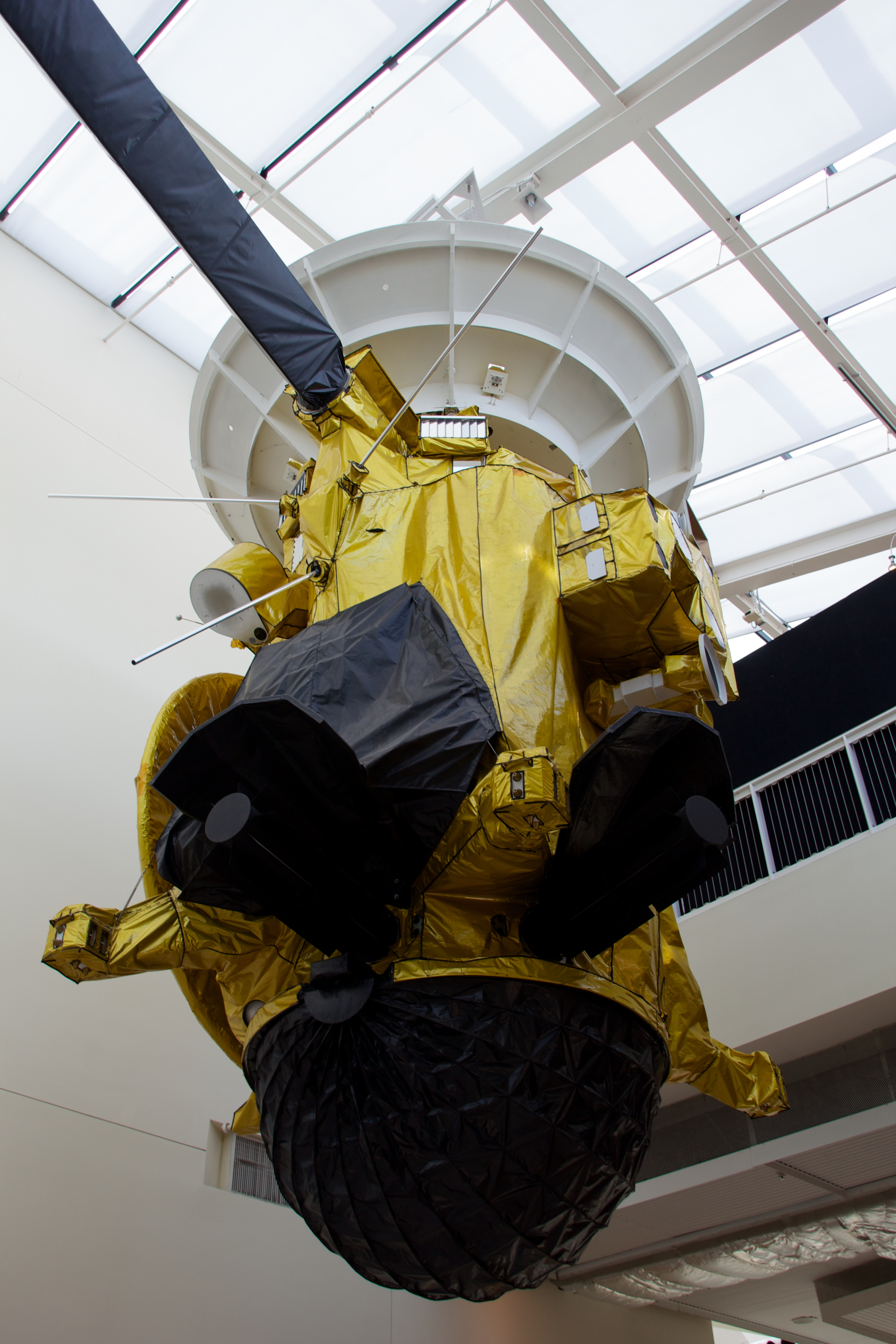
Cassini–Huygens

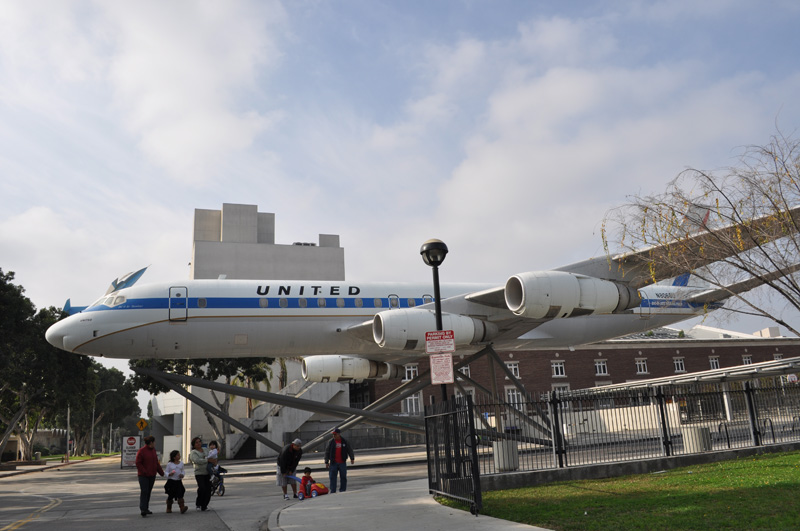
United Airlines DC-8 Jet Mainliner.

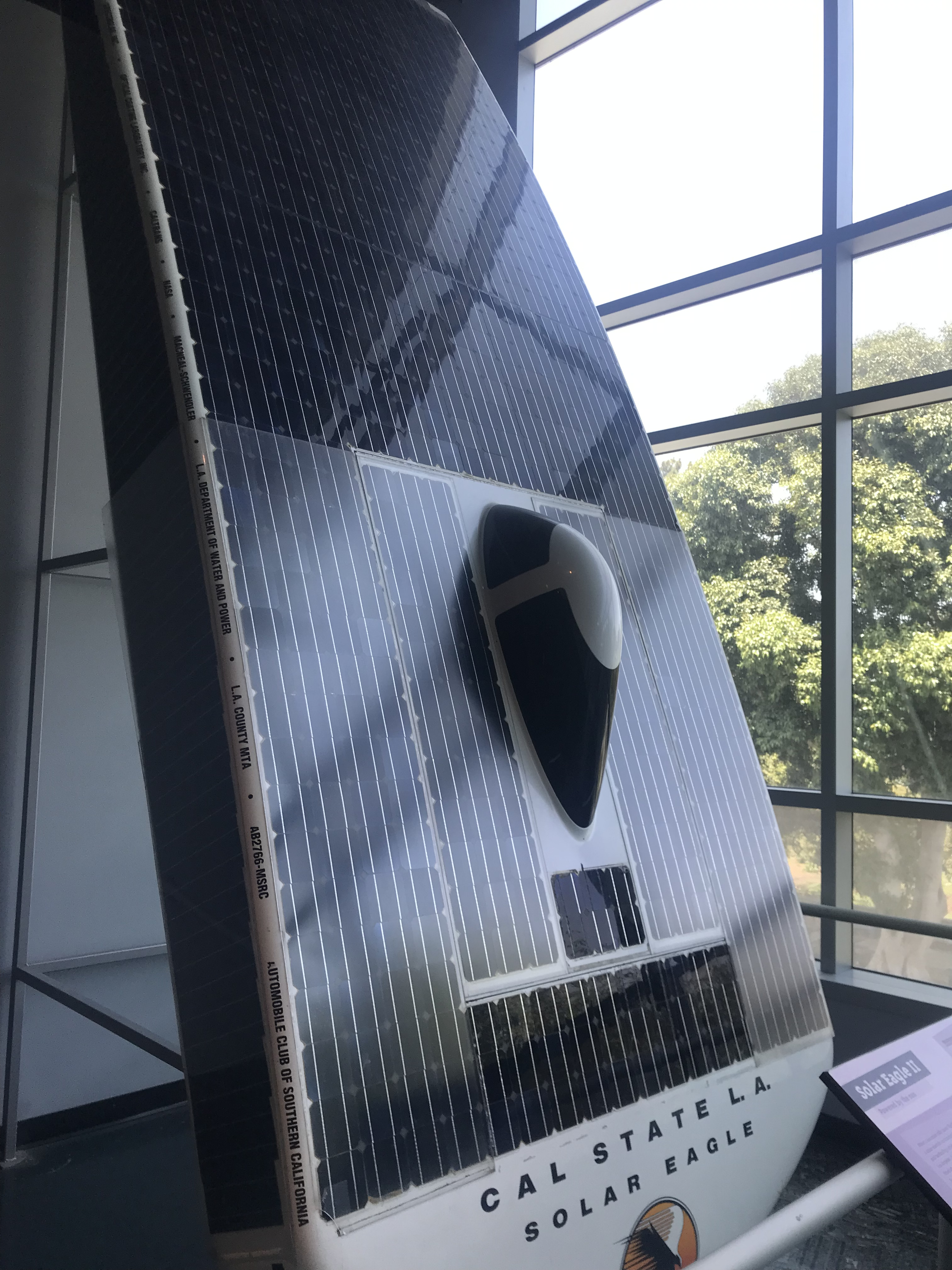
Cal State SolarEagle II vehicle.

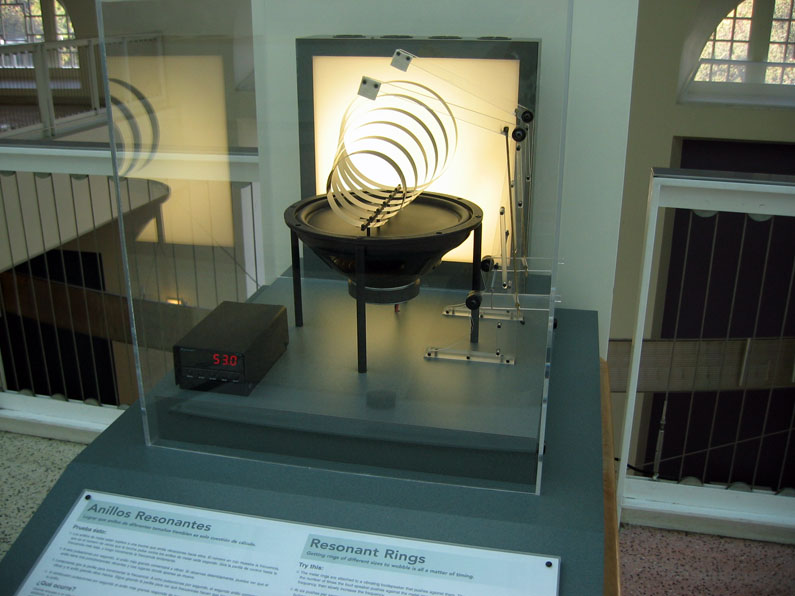
Interactive display.

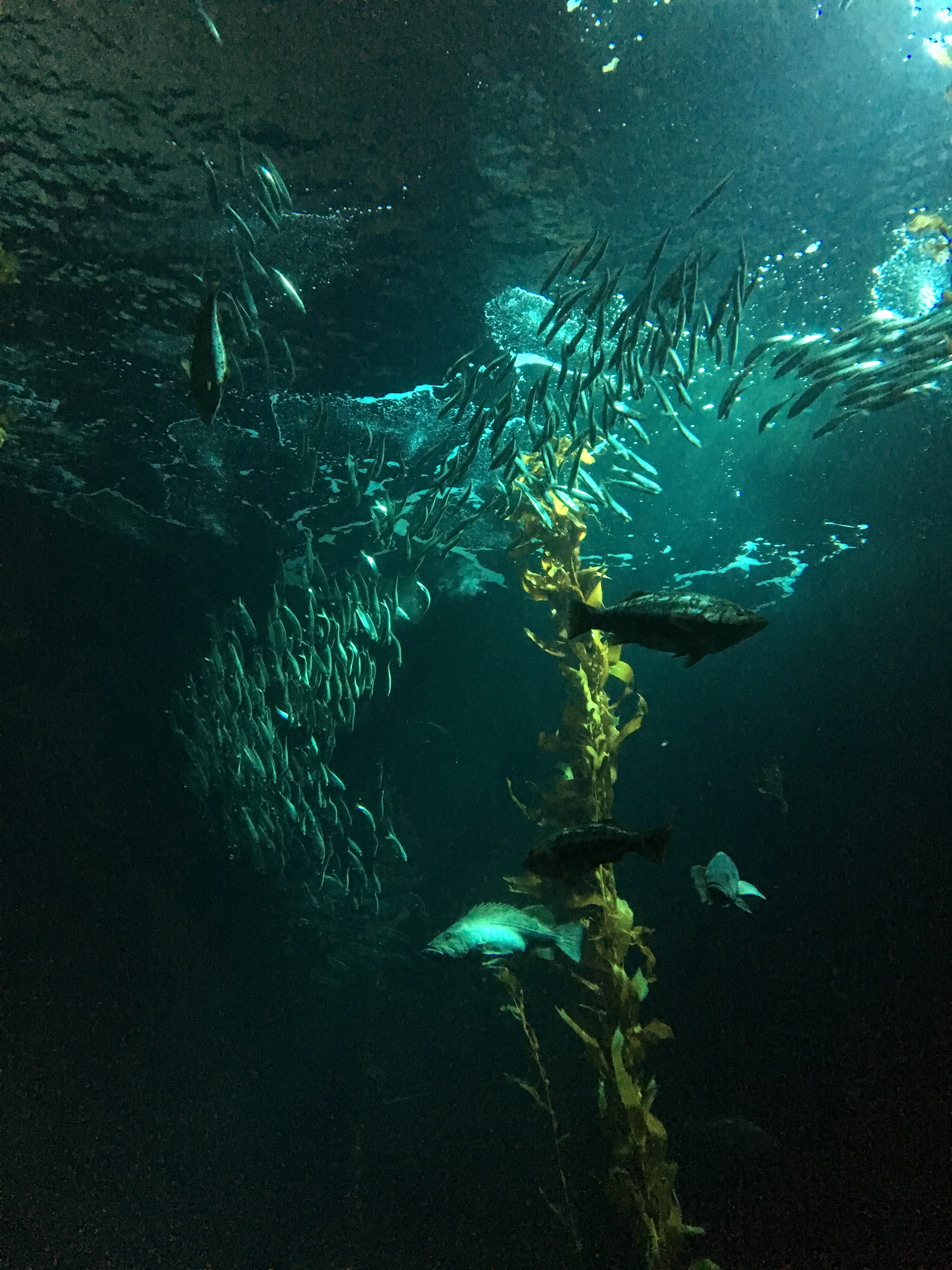
Tunnel Aquarium

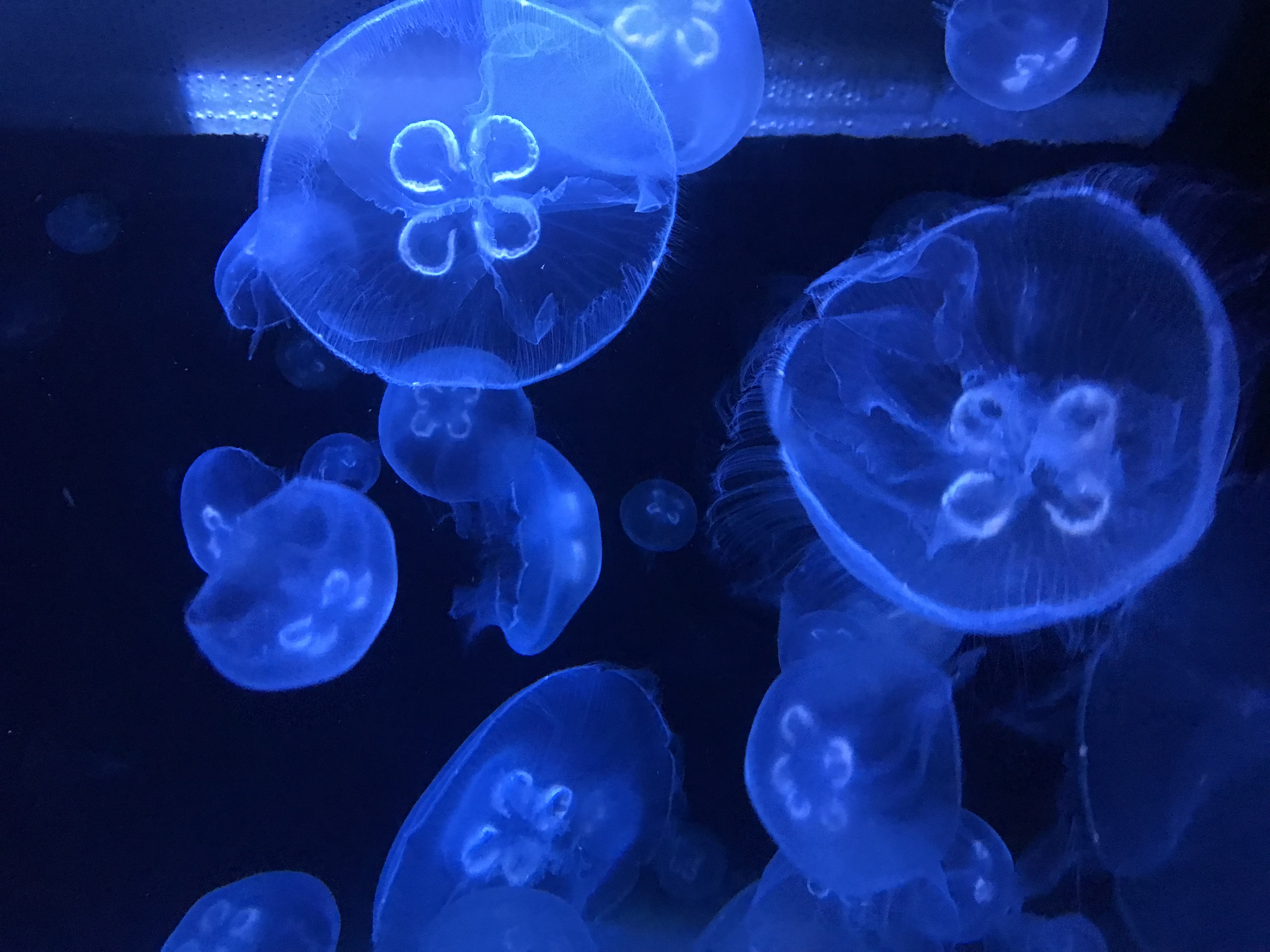
Moon Jellyfish

== See also ==
- List of most-visited museums in the United States
- List of works by Frank Gehry
- List of science centers
- List of aviation museums
