= Aligned, Multiple-transient Events in the First Palomar Sky Survey =

Scholarly journal article

- Author: Beatriz Villarroel and Stephen Bruehl
- Language: English
- Published: Publications of the Astronomical Society of the Pacific
- Publication date: October 2025
- Text: Aligned, Multiple-transient Events in the First Palomar Sky Survey online

Transients in the Palomar Observatory Sky Survey (POSS-I) may be associated with nuclear testing and reports of unidentified anomalous phenomena
- Author: Beatriz Villarroel and Stephen Bruehl
- Language: English
- Published: Scientific Reports
- Publication date: October 2025
- Text: Transients in the Palomar Observatory Sky Survey (POSS-I) may be associated with nuclear testing and reports of unidentified anomalous phenomena online

"Aligned, Multiple-transient Events in the First Palomar Sky Survey" and "Transients in the Palomar Observatory Sky Survey (POSS-I) may be associated with nuclear testing and reports of unidentified anomalous phenomena" are two companion papers published in October 2025 in Publications of the Astronomical Society of the Pacific and Scientific Reports, respectively. The principal authors of the two papers were astronomer Beatriz Villarroel and clinical psychologist Stephen Bruehl.

The authors of the two papers contended that their research indicated the potential presence of UFOs orbiting the Earth in the 1950s. Their conclusions or research methodology were met with wide skepticism, and criticized by physicists including Michael Wiescher, Nigel Hambly, Kevin Knuth, and others.

== Background ==
In the 1950s, San Diego's Mount Palomar Observatory photographed the northern sky in small sections. Subsequent research observed that some features present in the Palomar survey did not appear in later surveys. The difference was generally attributed to faults in the Palomar Observatory's glass photographic plates. In a 2021 paper, Beatriz Villarroel and several co-authors concluded the plate fault explanation for the Palomar artifacts was unlikely. Their conclusion was disputed in a critique paper published in 2024 which reasserted that the transients were artefacts resulting from the procedure used to copy the Palomar plates.

== Content ==
"Transients in the Palomar Observatory Sky Survey (POSS-I) may be associated with nuclear testing and reports of unidentified anomalous phenomena", published in Scientific Reports, and its companion paper, "Aligned, Multiple-transient Events in the First Palomar Sky Survey", published in Publications of the Astronomical Society of the Pacific, studied digital scans of the original Palomar photographic glass plates and determined that the frequency of the transients increased around the time of nuclear tests and civilian UFO sightings. In "Transients in the Palomar Observatory Sky Survey", the authors present arguments against several "prosaic explanations", such as plate defects, and advance two hypotheses to explain their findings: that of a "previously undocumented atmospheric phenomenon triggered by nuclear detonations" or that "nuclear weapons may attract UAP [UFOs]". Of the two, the authors claim the first hypothesis is unlikely.

Both papers were published in October 2025.

=== Authors ===
"Transients in the Palomar Observatory Sky Survey" was authored by Villarroel, an astronomer at the Nordic Institute for Theoretical Physics and by Stephen Bruehl, a psychologist at Vanderbilt University, with Bruehl serving as corresponding author. "Aligned, Multiple-transient Events in the First Palomar Sky Survey" was authored by Villarroel and Bruehl, with Villarroel serving as corresponding author. They were joined by Enrique Solano, Hichem Guergouri, Alina Streblyanska, Vitaly M. Andruk, Lars Mattsson, Rudolf E. Bär, Jamal Mimouni, Stefan Geier, Alok C. Gupta, Vanessa Okororie, Khaoula Laggoune, Matthew E. Shultz, and Robert A. Freitas Jr.

== Reception ==
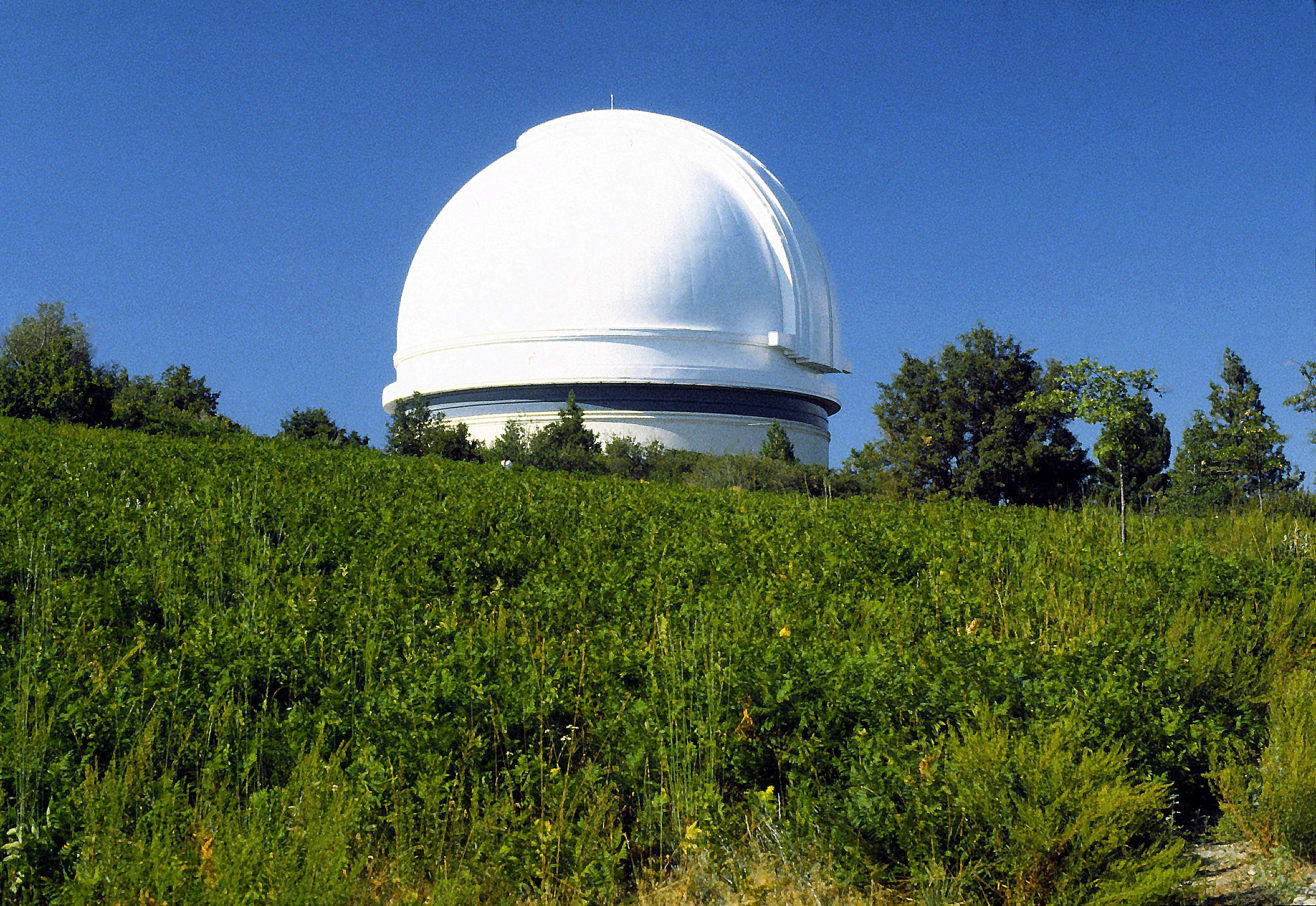
The two papers, principally authored by Beatriz Villarroel and Stephen Bruehl, were based on scans of images created by the Mount Palomar Observatory (pictured) in the 1950s.

=== Rejection of preprints by arXiv ===
ArXiv declined to archive preprints of either paper, asserting they lacked "sufficient or substantive scholarly research".

=== Initial skepticism by scientists ===
The two papers were critically received by the scientific community and met with wide skepticism.

Scientific American noted that there were many simpler explanations, and that this provided an opportunity for UFO skeptics and enthusiasts to see how extraordinary claims are scientifically tested. Michael C. F. Wiescher suggested Villarroel, Bruehl, and their coauthors had actually been observing debris that resulted from earlier nuclear tests and that would give the appearances of "bursts of radiance" when seen through a telescope. SETI's Eliot Gillum noted that Villarroel's results could be explained by meteors that flew directly towards the telescope's view, instead of perpendicular to it, resulting in the appearance of specks of light as opposed to streaks. Sean M. Kirkpatrick stated the results were probably the result of either solar flare radiation or high-altitude balloons.

Princeton University's Robert Lupton, a research astronomer, commented he was left unimpressed with the strength of the statistical analysis undertaken in Villarroel and Bruehl's research. Nigel Hambly, who specializes in digitized optical sky surveys, suggested that examining the actual plates—instead of digital copies as Villarroel and Bruehl did—might result in a different conclusion, and that "there's no shame in being wrong". Writing on his personal website, Adam Frank applauded the researchers' effort at peer review of the two papers, though cautioned that "getting your paper published in a peer-reviewed quality journal does not make it right".

=== Knuth, Watters, and Dominé critique ===
In a July 2026 critique paper in Publications of the Astronomical Society of Australia, Kevin Knuth, Wesley Andrés Watters, Laura Dominé, and collaborators challenged the conclusions of the POSS-I transient studies. The authors argued that the transient detections could be explained by photographic artefacts and raised concerns regarding data preparation, image validation, and statistical methodology.

In a column for Big Think, Adam Frank declared the Watters, et al. paper "a strong critique of the" VASCO studies, observing that Villarroel and her collaborators had failed to publish the dataset on which they relied, and holding open a "real possibility that the VASCO data set simply has not been vetted carefully enough" and that "because of all the problems identified in the Watters paper, the VASCO dataset cannot be considered to be uniformly random".

The critique itself was later disputed in a response paper by Villarroel, Streblyanska, Bruehl, and Geier, who argued that the Watters et al. analysis relied on a twenty times smaller and severely spatially biased subset of the POSS-I data originally developed for a different scientific purpose. They also noted the subset had a larger fraction of plate defects. The authors further argue that Watters et al. had failed to account for a geometric factor in their analysis, resulting in incorrect dates and times being assigned to each transient. As of 2026, the response paper remains available only as a preprint and has not been published in a peer-reviewed journal.

=== Independent follow-up analyses ===
In 2026, Ivo Busko reported the recovery of similar transient morphologies in archival photographic plates from the Hamburg Observatory, using independent plate material and analysis methods. Busko found the transients consistent with short flashes. A second study by Ivo Busko analysed historical astronomical photographic plates containing reported short-lived optical transients. Busko argues that several transient images display the same optical comatic aberration as neighbouring stellar images on the same photographic plates, and that because such comatic aberration is produced by a telescope's optics, the observations indicate that these transients were produced by light passing through the telescope rather than by photographic plate defects. The study did not identify the physical origin of the transients. As of 2026, Busko's studies are available only as preprints and have not been published in a peer-reviewed journal.
