= T Andromedae =

Variable star in the constellation Andromeda

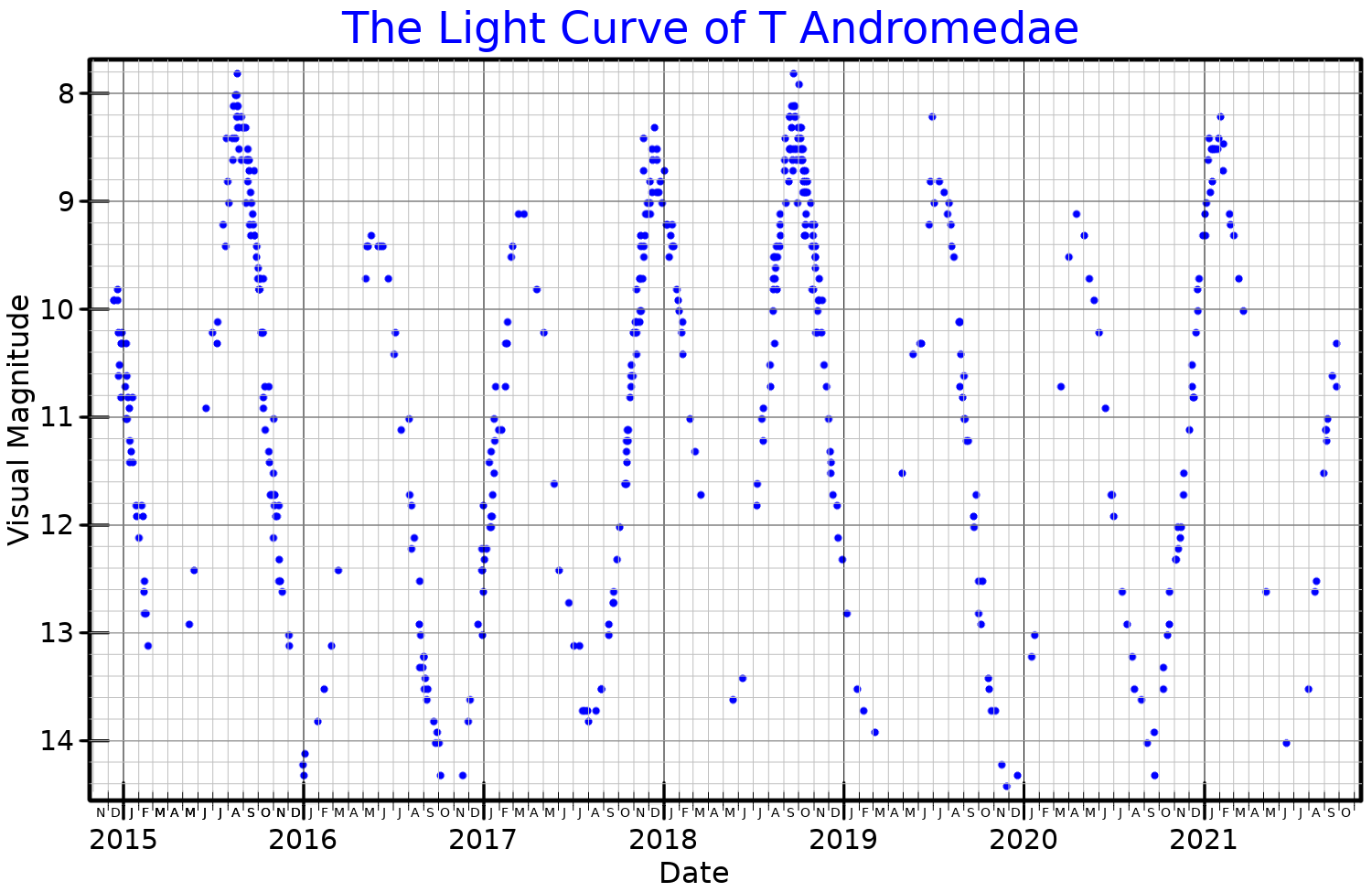
- A visual band light curve for T Andromedae, plotted from AAVSO data

Observation data Epoch J2000 Equinox J2000
- Constellation: Andromeda
- Right ascension: 00^{h} 22^{m} 23.14956^{s}
- Declination: +26° 59′ 45.73676″
- Apparent magnitude (V): 7.70 – 14.30 variable

Characteristics
- Spectral type: M4e-M7.5e
- B−V color index: 2.63
- Variable type: Mira

Astrometry
Radial velocity (R_{v})	−90±10 km/s
Proper motion (μ)	RA: −7.108 mas/yr Dec.: −3.352 mas/yr
Parallax (π)	0.5913±0.0815 mas
Distance	approx. 5,500 ly (approx. 1,700 pc)

Details
Mass	4.9 M_{☉}
Luminosity	8.928 L_{☉}
Surface gravity (log g)	−0.51 cgs
Temperature	3,235 K
Metallicity [Fe/H]	−0.39 dex

Other designations
- BD +26°43, HD 1795, SAO 73930

Database references
SIMBAD	data

T Andromedae (T And) is a variable star of the Mira type in the constellation Andromeda. Like all the stars of this kind, T And is a cool asymptotic giant branch star of spectral type M4e-M7.5e. Its brightness varies periodically, completing a cycle in 281 days. The peak luminosity, however, is different every variability cycle, but can reach a peak magnitude m_{v}=7.70.

Thomas David Anderson discovered that T Andromedae is a variable star, in 1894. The next year, Edward Charles Pickering examined archival photographic plates to derive a light curve for the star, and calculated a period of 281 days.

Measurements of the angular size variations of T And made with the Palomar Testbed Interferometer show no clear correlation with the star's brightness variations.
