= Youssif (burn survivor) =

Iraqi torture victim (born 2001)

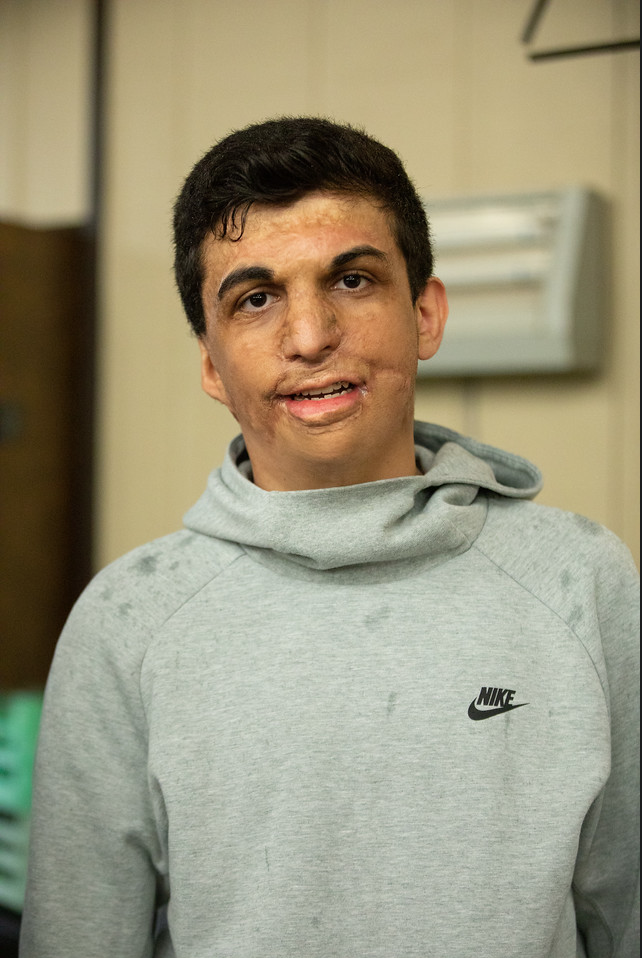
- Youssif at Family Camp at Canyon Creek 2019
- Born: August 31, 2001 (age 25); Baghdad, Iraq
- Citizenship: Iraqi; American
- Years active: 2007-present
- Known for: Facial burns

Youssif (born August 31, 2001) is an Iraqi man who was set on fire by a group of unknown masked men outside of his central Baghdad home on January 15, 2007.

== Background ==
On January 15, 2007, while playing outside his Baghdad home, Youssif was approached by masked men who proceeded to pour gasoline on him, set him on fire, and flee, leaving then-5-year-old Youssif to burn. After the attack, Youssif's father spent nine months trying to obtain medical care in Iraq to treat his son's scarring, without success. Doctors in Iraq told the family that there was little they could do to help and that the family's only option was to seek treatment outside Iraq, an option they simply could not afford.

Eventually, after being told they could help, Youssif's father visited CNN's Baghdad bureau to ask for advice on how to help his son. In doing so, Youssif's parents risked their safety. When asked by CNN why they took such a risk, Youssif's mother, Zainab, responded: "I'd prefer death than seeing my son like this."

In August 2007, Arwa Damon reported on Youssif's story on CNN, which resulted in an international outpouring of support for the boy, with thousands across the world expressing willingness to donate to help him and his family. The story went on to become one of the most-read, non-breaking news stories in CNN.com's 12-year history.

No arrests have ever been made in connection with the attack.

== Treatment ==
The California-based Children's Burn Foundation arranged for and agreed to pay for transportation, medical, and housing costs for Youssif and his family. Dr. Peter Grossman, of the Sherman Oaks Grossman Burn Center, volunteered to perform the necessary surgeries for free. After a fund was established by CNN and the Children's Burn Foundation, over $300,000 was donated.

Youssif, his father, mother, and baby sister arrived in the United States on September 11, 2007. Youssif's first surgery was performed on September 20, 2007.

== Progress and recovery ==
Since 2007, Youssif has undergone over twenty surgeries. Youssif's biggest scar was removed in his second surgery on November 29, 2007.

Youssif's second surgery resulted in some short-term complications. Just hours after Youssif's family began celebrating a successful surgery, they found his bed sheets soaked in blood. Dr. Grossman and his team immediately returned to the operating room and found that the source of the bleeding was an arterial blood vessel, which was brought under control in just thirty minutes. Youssif, however, was rushed back to the operating room for the third time in twenty-four hours due to further bleeding, this time from an arterial blood vessel on the other side of his face. Dr. Grossman had to re-open Youssif's stitches—around 60 to 100 of them—to locate the source of the bleeding, a process that lasted almost two hours. By the next day, Youssif's recovery was back on track. The long-term effects of the surgery were successful.

Youssif began attending an American school in January 2008.

Before his attack, Youssif told his parents he wished to become a doctor. Youssif told CNN's Sanjay Gupta that he continues to hold this dream on the August 14, 2010 special edition of Sanjay Gupta MD. When asked why he wanted to be a doctor, Youssif responded, "to help people". Youssif's parents continue to support his dream, telling CNN, "We want our son to go places that we couldn't even dream of."

As of December 2011, Youssif and his family were living in Los Angeles and working to obtain US citizenships.
