= Gattini-IR =

Survey telescope at the Palomar Observatory

Gattini-IR is a survey telescope that observes in the near-infrared and started operation at the Palomar Observatory in late 2018.

It is planned to survey the entire accessible sky every night. It has a 2048x2048 sensor, and will observe in the J band (1.25um) infrared. Each nights images will be sensitive down to magnitude (M_{AB}) 16.4, and by stacking a weeks images should be sensitive to M_{AB} 17.5.

== See also ==
- Infrared astronomy
  - Hubble WFC3, J-band near-IR
  - James Webb Space Telescope, near to far-IR
- List of telescope types
