= Samuel Oschin =

American entrepreneur

- Born: July 18, 1914; Dayton, Ohio
- Died: July 28, 2003 (aged 89)
- Occupations: Manufacturer; Real estate developer Banker
- Spouse: Lynda Oschin
- Children: Michael Oschin; Barbara Oschin Ellis

Samuel Oschin (July 18, 1914 – July 28, 2003), born in Dayton, Ohio, was a Los Angeles entrepreneur and philanthropist.

== Biography ==
Oschin was born to a Jewish family on July 18, 1914, in Dayton, Ohio. He had brothers, Albert Oschin and Irving Oschin and sister, Ruth Oschin Weiss. At the age of ten, he started working cleaning chimneys, which grew into a small business, employing other boys. He never completed high school, instead working with his father who was a painter, and then took a job at Briggs manufacturing, a tool and die company in Detroit. During World War II, he and his two brothers formed a tool and die company and won a large contract supplying airplane parts to the United States Army Air Forces, which eventually evolved to the manufacture of bombs. After the war, he converted his factory to the manufacture of furniture to support increased demand from returning soldiers. In 1946, he moved to Los Angeles and started an air conditioning business with his brother. Seeing the demand for housing, he started a real estate development and construction company and was responsible for building one of the first planned communities in Oxnard. He then purchased the Empire Savings and Loan Association in Pacoima, California, which he grew to 27 branches statewide. In 1974, he sold Empire Savings and Loan to Allstate. Oschin continued to build low cost housing in conjunction with the Department of Housing and Urban Development (HUD) until his retirement.

== Philanthropy ==
Oschin's successful business ventures in manufacturing, banking, investment, and real estate development enabled philanthropic work in many areas, including astronomy, medicine, education, and the arts. In 1981, he founded the Mr. and Mrs. Samuel Oschin Family Foundation.

After a generous donation to Palomar Observatory, the 48-inch Schmidt telescope there was renamed for him. Other organisations named for him include the Comprehensive Cancer Institute at Cedars-Sinai Medical Center and the planetarium at Griffith Observatory. A new addition to the California Science Center, the Samuel Oschin Air and Space Center, opened on November 13, 2026, and is the permanent home of the Space Shuttle Endeavour, which was on temporary display in the Samuel Oschin Pavilion, which opened on October 30, 2012. In January 2026, The Mr. and Mrs. Samuel Oschin Family Foundation gave a major gift to the Natural History Museum of Los Angeles County, allowing the establishment of the Samuel Oschin Global Center for Ice Age Research.

Additionally, Oschin supported the Anti-Defamation League, The Jewish Home for the Aging, and Temple B'nai Hayim in Sherman Oaks, California.

== Personal life ==
Oschin died on July 28, 2003. He is survived by his wife Lynda, a son, Michael Oschin, and a daughter, Barbara Oschin Ellis.

Oschin was a noted adventure traveler. He retraced Robert Peary's voyage to the North Pole, paddled up the Amazon in a dugout canoe, and crossed the Alps on an elephant following the story of Hannibal.
