= Nigel Hambly =

Nigel Hambly is an astronomer who, as of 2025, is employed at the University of Edinburgh.

With John Cooke, Hambly is co-discoverer of the red dwarf star SIPS 1259-4336.

He is a fellow of the Royal Astronomical Society.
