= Children's Burn Foundation =

Non-profit organization in the U.S.

The Children's Burn Foundation is an American non-profit organization founded in 1985 to meet the physical, psychological and financial needs of children who have been severely burned. Located in Sherman Oaks, California, it was founded by Dr. Paul Navarro and Daniel Navarro. One child supported by the Children's Burn Foundation is Youssif, a young Iraqi boy set on fire by masked men outside of his Baghdad home in 2007.
