= Milky Way in mythology =

Mythological interpretations of the origin of the Milky Way

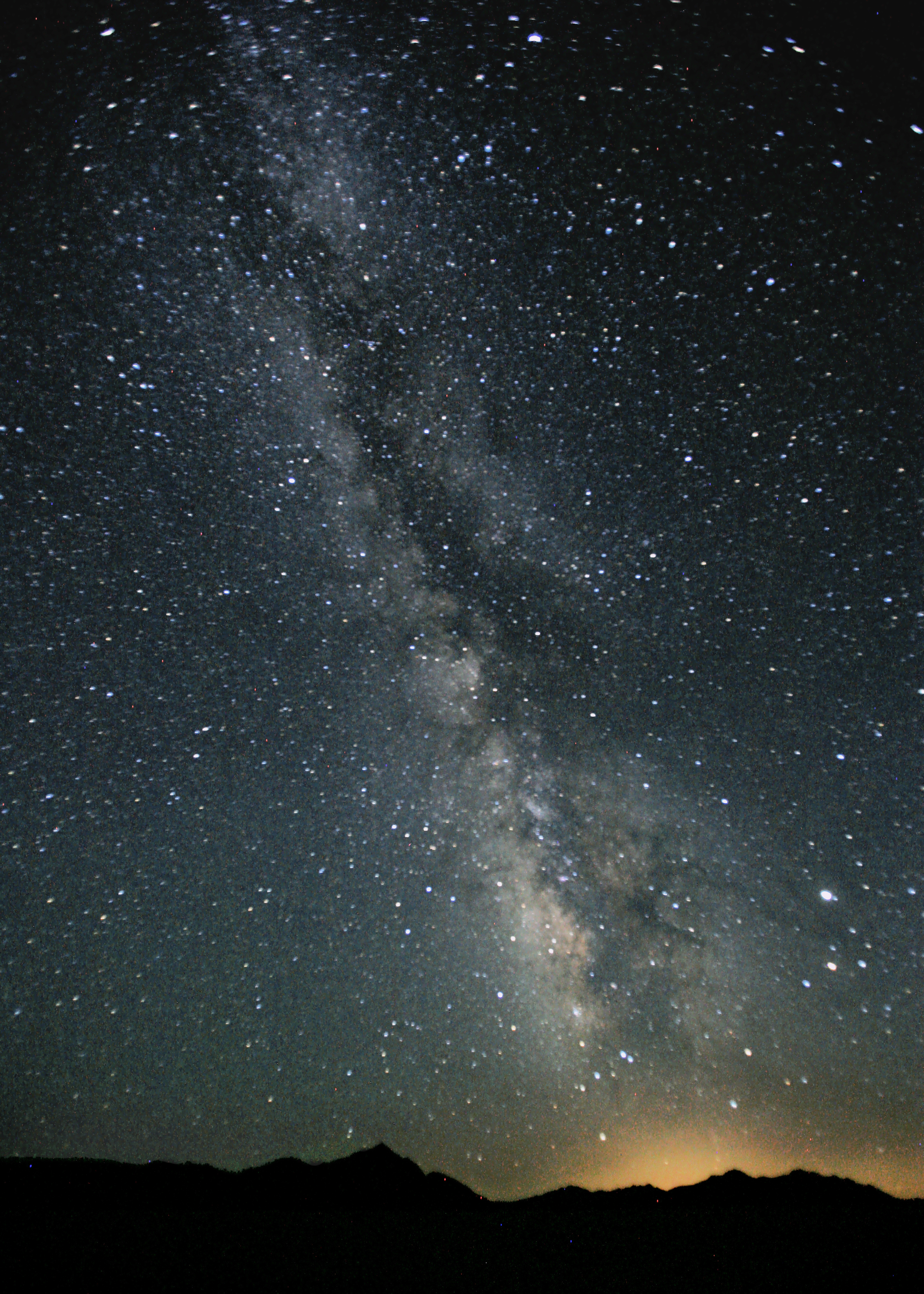
The Milky Way as seen from a site with little light pollution

There are many myths and legends about the origin of the Milky Way, the crowd of stars that makes a distinctive bright streak across the night sky.

== Mythology among cultures ==
=== Armenian ===
Ancient Armenian mythology called the Milky Way the "Straw Thief's Way". According to legend, the warrior god Vahagn stole some straw from the Assyrian king Barsham and brought it to Armenia during a cold winter. When he fled across the heavens, he spilled some of the straw along the way. This was then called, Հարդագողի ճանապարհ (Hartkoghi Janabarh).

=== Australian Aboriginal ===
Aboriginal Australian people had a well-developed astronomy, with much of their mythology and cultural practices relating to the stars, planets and their motion through the sky, as well as using the stars to navigate the Australian continent.

The Kaurna people of the Adelaide Plains in South Australia see the band of the Milky Way as a river in the sky world. They called it Wodliparri (wodli = hut, house, parri = river) and believe that positioned along the river are a number of campfires. In addition, the dark patches mark the dwelling place of a dangerous creature known as a yura; the Kaurna call these patches Yurakauwe, which literally means "monster water".

A group of Yolngu people from the Ramingining area in central Arnhem Land in the Northern Territory have a Dreaming story known as "Milky Way Dreaming". In this story, which relates to the land, two spirit beings in the form of female quolls attacked their husband. The husband becomes a glider possum, gathers his warriors, and returns to kill them with spears. The spirits of the quolls transform into a type of freshwater fish, but they are caught in the creek nearby by the husband's tribesmen and eaten. Their bones are collected by their brother, Wäk, aka the crow man, and put into a hollow log coffin. The Badurru Ceremony is performed and the coffin carried into the sky by the crow and his kin. The bones are then dispersed and form the Milky Way.

Aboriginal groups from the Cape York region of Queensland see the band of light as termites that had been blown into the sky by the ancestral hero Burbuk Boon.

Further south, the band of stars that comprise the Milky Way are seen as thousands of flying foxes carrying away a dancer known as Purupriggie.

The Aranda or Arrernte people, who come from Central Australia, see the band of the Milky Way as a river or creek in the sky world. This stellar river separates the two great camps of the Aranda and Luritja people. The stars to the east of this river represent the camps of the Aranda and the stars to the west represent Luritja encampments and some stars closer to the band represent a mixture of both.

In the Kimberley region of Western Australia, the Aboriginal people called the Milky Way "Iowara" and see in it the presence of a giant emu elongated.

=== Cherokee ===
A Cherokee folktale tells of a dog who stole some cornmeal and was chased away. He ran away to the north, spilling the cornmeal along the way. The Milky Way is thus called ᎩᎵ ᎤᎵᏒᏍᏓᏅᏱ (Gili Ulisvsdanvyi) "Where the dog ran".

=== Eastern Asia ===
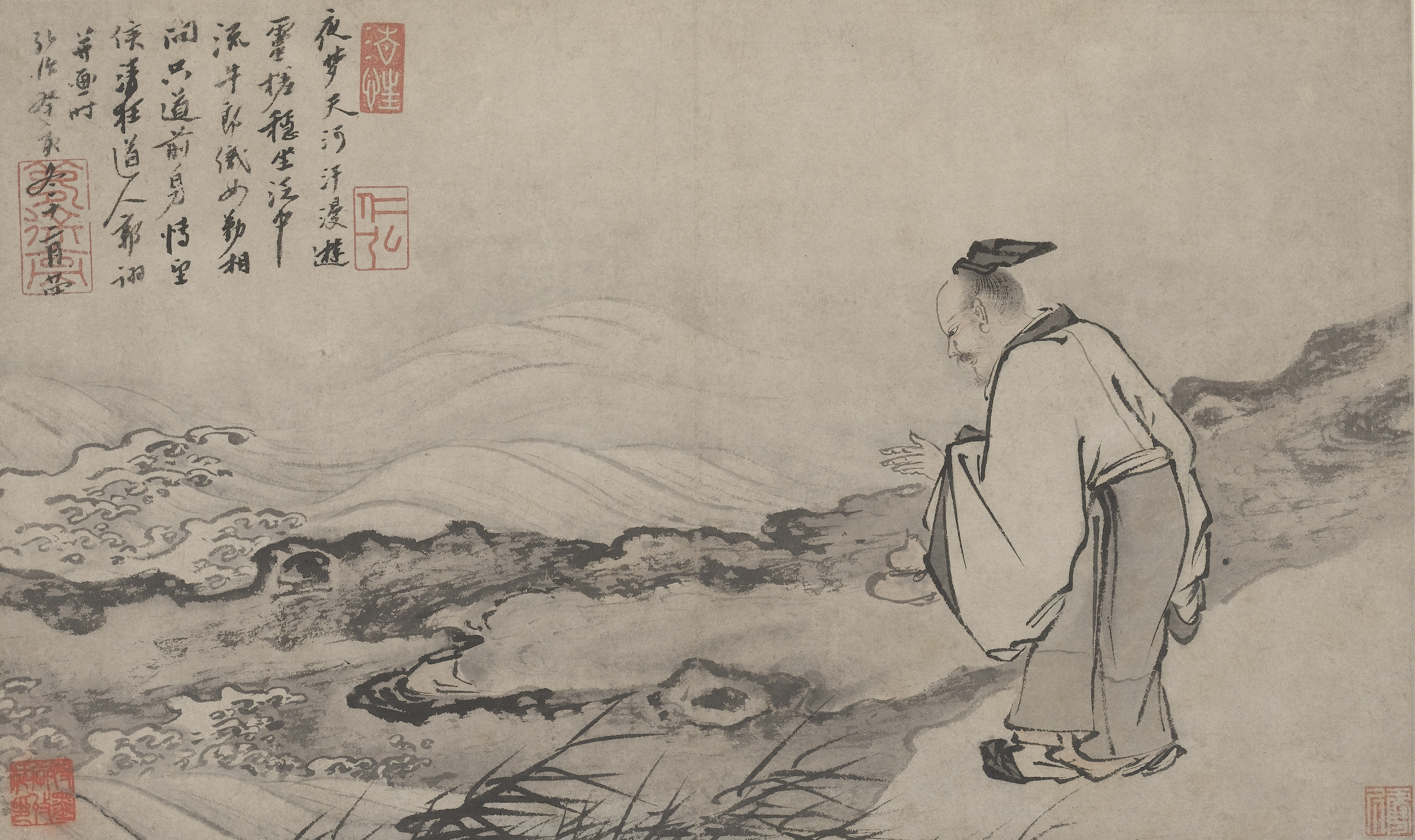
"The creation of the River of Heaven".

In Eastern Asian and Chinese mythology, the hazy band of stars of the Milky Way was referred to as the "River of Heaven" or the "Silvery River" (simplified Chinese: 银河; traditional Chinese: 銀河; pinyin: yínhé; Korean: 은하; RR: eunha; Vietnamese: ngân hà; Japanese: 銀河, romanized: ginga).

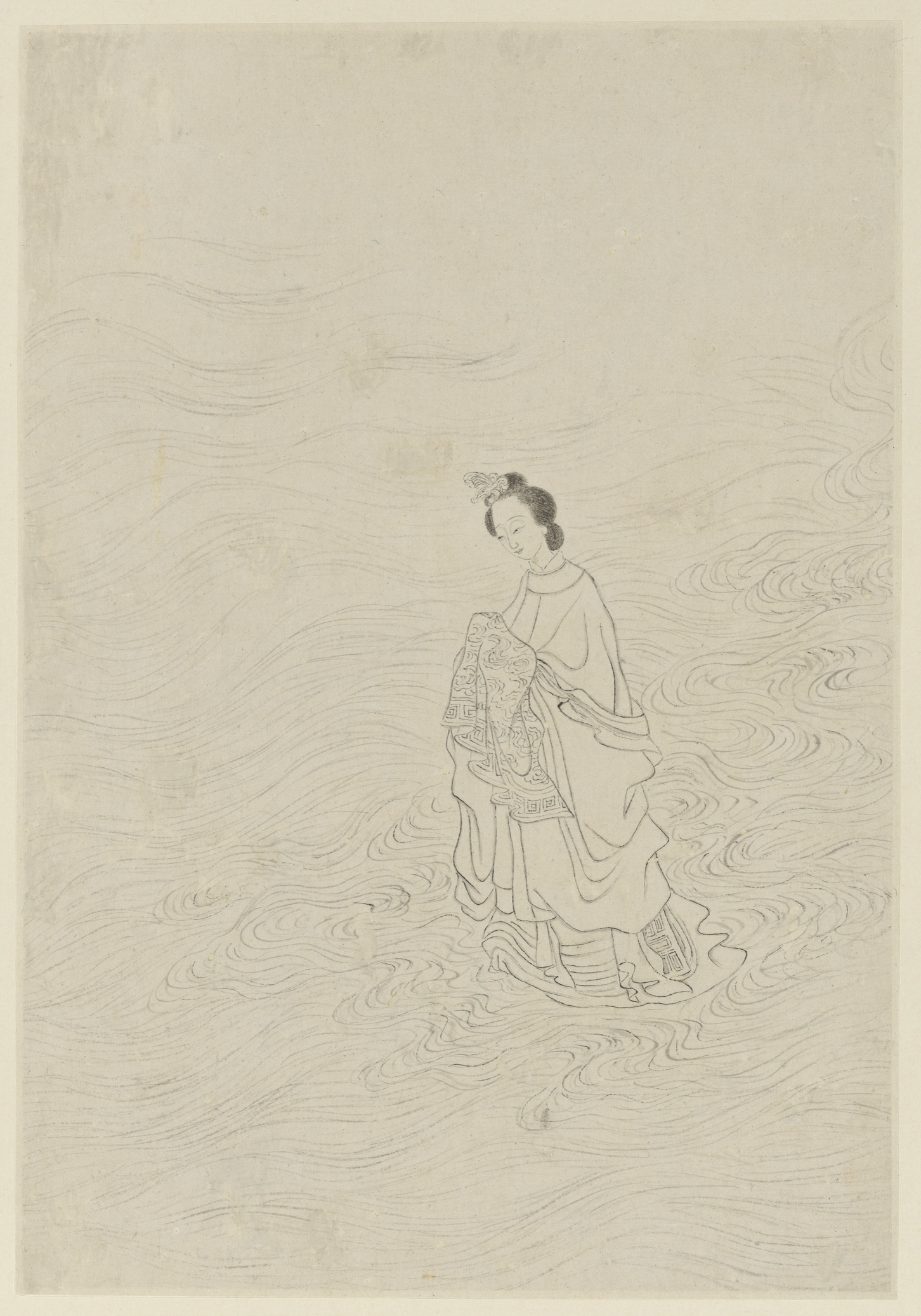
Zhinü crossing the River of Heaven, as painted by Gai Qi, 1799.

The Silvery River of Heaven is part of a romantic Chinese folk tale, The Cowherd and the Weaver Girl, of the romance between Zhinü, the weaver girl, symbolizing the star Vega, and Niulang, the cowherd, symbolizing the star Altair. Their love was not allowed, and they were banished to opposite sides of the heavenly river. Once a year, on the seventh day of the seventh lunar month, a flock of crows and magpies would form a bridge over the heavenly river to reunite the lovers for a single day. That day is celebrated as Qixi, literally meaning 'Seventh Night' (Chinese: 七夕; pinyin: Qīxī; Korean: 칠석; RR: chilseok, Vietnamese: Thất Tịch, and Japanese: 七夕, romanized: Tanabata).

=== Egyptian ===
In Egyptian mythology, the Milky Way was considered a pool of cow's milk. The Milky Way was deified as a fertility cow-goddess by the name of Bat (later on syncretized with the sky goddess Hathor).

The astronomer Or Graur has suggested that the Egyptians may have seen the Milky Way as a celestial depiction of the sky goddess Nut.

=== Finnic and Baltic ===
Among the Finns, Estonians and related peoples, the Milky Way was and is called "The Pathway of the Birds" (Finnish: Linnunrata, Estonian: Linnutee). The Finns observed that migratory birds used the galaxy as a guideline to travel south, where they believed Lintukoto (bird home) was.

In Estonian folklore it is believed that the birds are led by a white bird with the head of a maiden who chases birds of prey away. The maiden, the goddess Lindu, was the Queen of the Birds and the daughter of Ukko, the King of the Sky. After refusing the suits of the Sun and Moon for being too predictable in their routes and the Pole Star for being fixed, she fell in love with the Light of North for its beauty. They became engaged, but the inconstant Light of North left her soon afterward. The tears of the broken-hearted Lindu fell on her wedding veil, which became the Milky Way when her father brought her to heaven so she could reign by his side and guide the migrating birds, who followed the trail of stars in her veil. Only later did scientists indeed confirm this observation; the migratory birds use the Milky Way as a guide to travel to warmer, southern lands during the winter.

The name in the Indo-European Baltic languages has the same meaning (Lithuanian: Paukščių Takas, Latvian: Putnu Ceļš).

=== Greek and Roman ===
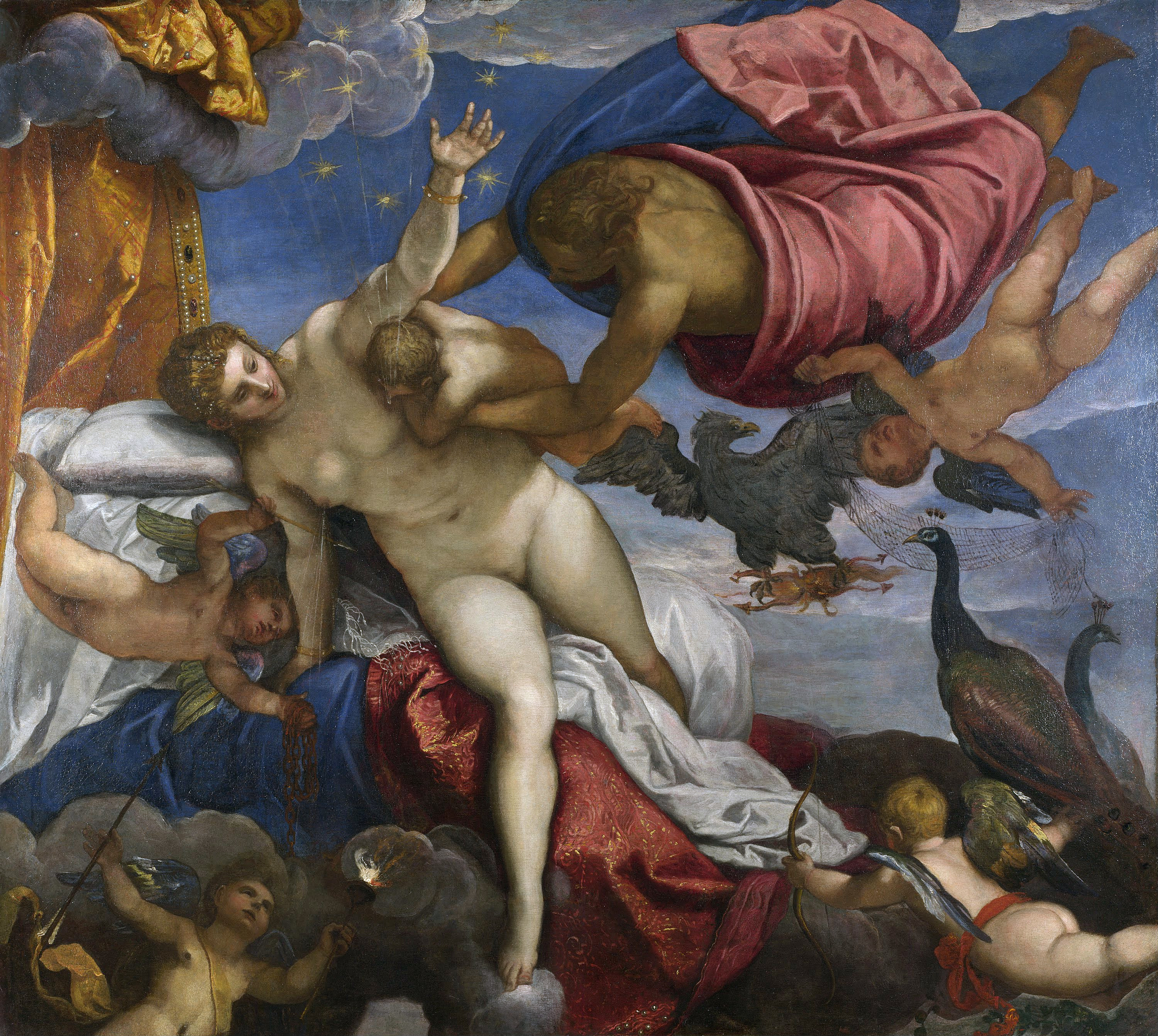
Jacopo Tintoretto's The Origin of the Milky Way (c. 1575-1580).

The Greek name for the Milky Way (Γαλαξίας Galaxias) is derived from the Greek word for milk (γάλα, gala). One legend explains how the Milky Way was created by Heracles (Roman Hercules) when he was a baby. His father, Zeus, was fond of his son, who was born of the mortal woman Alcmene. He decided to let the infant Heracles suckle on his divine wife Hera's milk when she was asleep, an act which would endow the baby with godlike qualities. When Hera woke and realized that she was breastfeeding an unknown infant, she pushed him away and the spurting milk became the Milky Way.

Another version of the myth is that Heracles was abandoned in the woods by his mortal parents, Amphitryon and Alcmene. Heracles, son of Zeus and Alcmene, was naturally favored by his father, who sent Athena, Greek goddess of wisdom, to retrieve him. Athena, not being so motherly, decided to take him to Hera to suckle. Hera agreed to suckle Heracles. As Heracles drank the milk, he bit down, and Hera pushed him away in pain. The milk that squirted out formed the Milky Way.

A story told by the Roman Hyginus in the Poeticon astronomicon (ultimately based on Greek myth) says that the milk came from the goddess Ops (Greek Rhea), the wife of Saturn (Greek Cronus). Saturn swallowed his children to ensure his position as head of the pantheon and sky god, and so Ops conceived a plan to save her newborn son Jupiter (Greek Zeus): She wrapped a stone in infant's clothes and gave it to Saturn to swallow. Saturn asked her to nurse the child once more before he swallowed it, and the milk that spurted when she pressed her nipple against the rock eventually became the Milky Way.

=== Hebrew ===
In the Hebrew astronomy, the Milky Way is called "Fire-Stream", a name borrowed from Daniel 7:10 (Nehar di-nur), where it may possibly have had the same signification. The statement is also made that the sting of Scorpio may be seen lying in the Milky Way.

=== Hungarian ===
In Hungarian mythology, Prince Csaba, the mythical son of Attila the Hun and ancestor of the Hungarians, is supposed to ride down the Milky Way when the Székelys (ethnic Hungarians living in Transylvania) are threatened. Thus the Milky Way is called "The Road of the Warriors" (lit. "Road of Armies"; Hungarian: Hadak Útja). The stars are sparks from their horseshoes.

=== Indian and Hindu ===
In the Hindu collection of stories called Bhagavata Purana, all the visible stars and planets moving through space are likened to a dolphin that swims through the water, and the heavens are called śiśumãra cakra, the dolphin disc. The Milky Way forms the abdomen of the dolphin and is called Akasaganga which means "The Ganges River of the Sky".

According to Hindu mythology, Vishnu lies meditating on Shesha with his consort Lakshmi, in the Kshira Sagara (Sea of Milk), which is a representation of Milky Way.

This "Sea of Milk" is also the (cosmic) ocean referenced in the Samudra Manthana episode of Vishnu Purana, a major text in Indian mythology. The Samudra Manthana explains the origin of the elixir of eternal life, amrita.

=== Irish ===
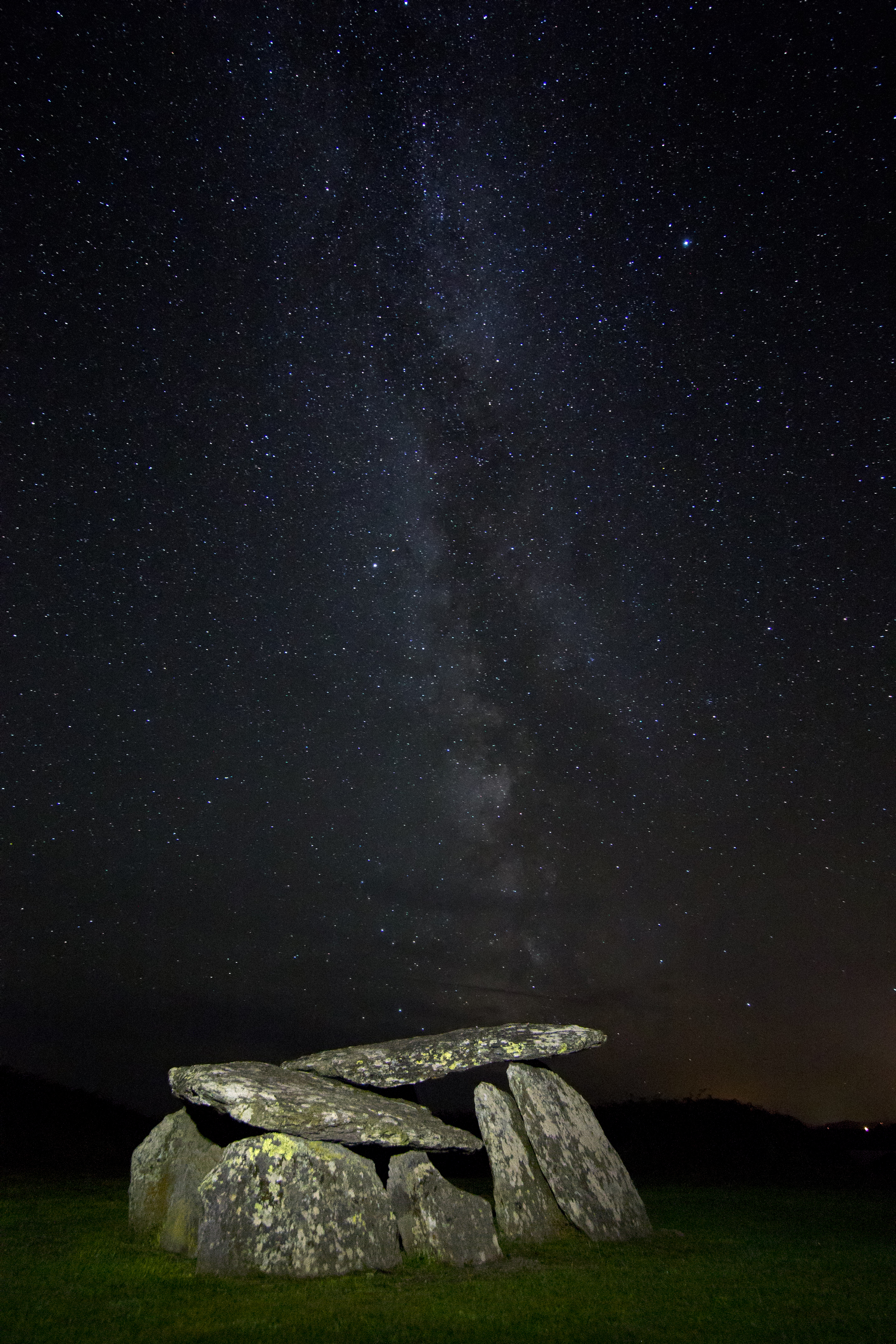
Altar Wedge Tomb (c. 2500–2000 BC), Ireland, under the Milky Way.

In Irish mythology, the main name of the Milky Way was Bealach na Bó Finne — Way of the White Cow. It was regarded as a heavenly reflection of the sacred River Boyne, which is described as "the Great Silver Yoke" and the "White Marrow of Fedlimid," names which could equally apply to the Milky Way. (Mór-Chuing Argait, Smir Find Fedlimthi).

Other names include:

- Ceann Síne—"chief chain"
- Síog na Spéire—"stripe of the sky"
- Earball na Lárach Báine—the White Mare's Tail. The Láir Bhán (white mare) is believed to a relic of a sovereignty goddess, and processions featuring a white hobby horse formerly took place in County Kerry around Samhain (Hallowe'en).
- Claí Mór na Réaltaí—"Great Ditch/Fence of the Stars"
- Sgríob Chlann Uisnich—"Track of the children of Uisneach." This name derives from a legend: after the sons of Uisneach fell in battle, Deirdre threw herself into their grave. Angered, the king Conchobar mac Nessa exhumed the bodies and buried them separately, but a tree grew from each grave and the branches entwined. Again he had them dug up and buried on opposite sides of a lake; but then the great cluster of stars appeared across the sky, connecting the two graves.

=== Māori ===
To the Māori the Milky Way is the waka (canoe) of Tama-rereti. The front and back of the canoe are Orion and Scorpius, while the Southern Cross and the Pointers are the anchor and rope. According to legend, when Tama-rereti took his canoe out onto a lake, he found himself far from home as night was falling. There were no stars at this time and in the darkness the Taniwha would attack and eat people. So Tama-rereti sailed his canoe along the river that emptied into the heavens (to cause rain) and scattered shiny pebbles from the lakeshore into the sky. The sky god, Ranginui, was pleased by this action and placed the canoe into the sky as well as a reminder of how the stars were made.

=== Mesopotamian ===
In the Babylonian epic poem Enûma Eliš, the Milky Way is created from the severed tail of the primeval salt water dragoness Tiamat, set in the sky by Marduk, the Babylonian national god, after slaying her. This story was once thought to have been based on an older Sumerian version in which Tiamat is instead slain by Enlil of Nippur, but is now thought to be purely an invention of Babylonian propagandists with the intention to show Marduk as superior to the Sumerian deities. Another myth about Labbu is similarly interpreted.

=== San ===
The San people in southern Africa say that long ago there were no stars and the night was pitch black. A girl of the ancient race, !Xwe-/na-ssho-!ke, who was lonely and wanted to visit other people, threw the embers from a fire into the sky and created the Milky Way.

=== Serbian ===
In Serbian, the Milky Way is called Kumova slama 'godparent's's straw'. A legend explains that once, a godparent stole straw from another, but as he was carrying it away, he was losing some of it. Then, God put the straw in the sky as a permanent warning not to steal.

=== Welsh ===
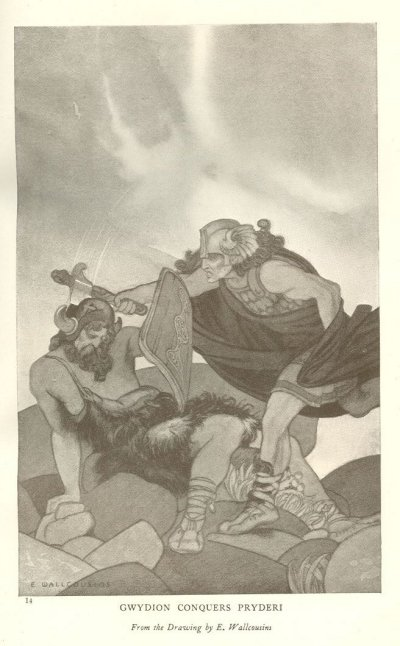
In Welsh mythology the Milky Way is associated with Gwydion fab Dôn.

Welsh mythology and cosmology derives from the ancient oral traditions of the Celtic Britons, which were maintained by druids and bards until the time of their recording in medieval Welsh literature. Many features of the night sky are named for the "children of Dôn" the ancient mother goddess and sky goddess, with the Milky Way being associated with Gwydion ab Dôn (the son of Dôn), and named Caer Gwydion ("The fortress/city of Gwydion") or Llwybr Caer Gwydion ("the path to the Castle of Gwydion").

Llys Dôn (literally "The Court of Dôn") is the traditional Welsh name for the constellation Cassiopeia. At least two of Dôn's children also have astronomical associations: Caer Gwydion ("The fortress of Gwydion") is the traditional Welsh name for the Milky Way, and Caer Arianrhod ("The Fortress of Arianrhod") being the constellation of Corona Borealis.

== See also ==
- List of names for the Milky Way
