= The Cowherd and the Weaver Girl =

Pair of lovers from Chinese mythology

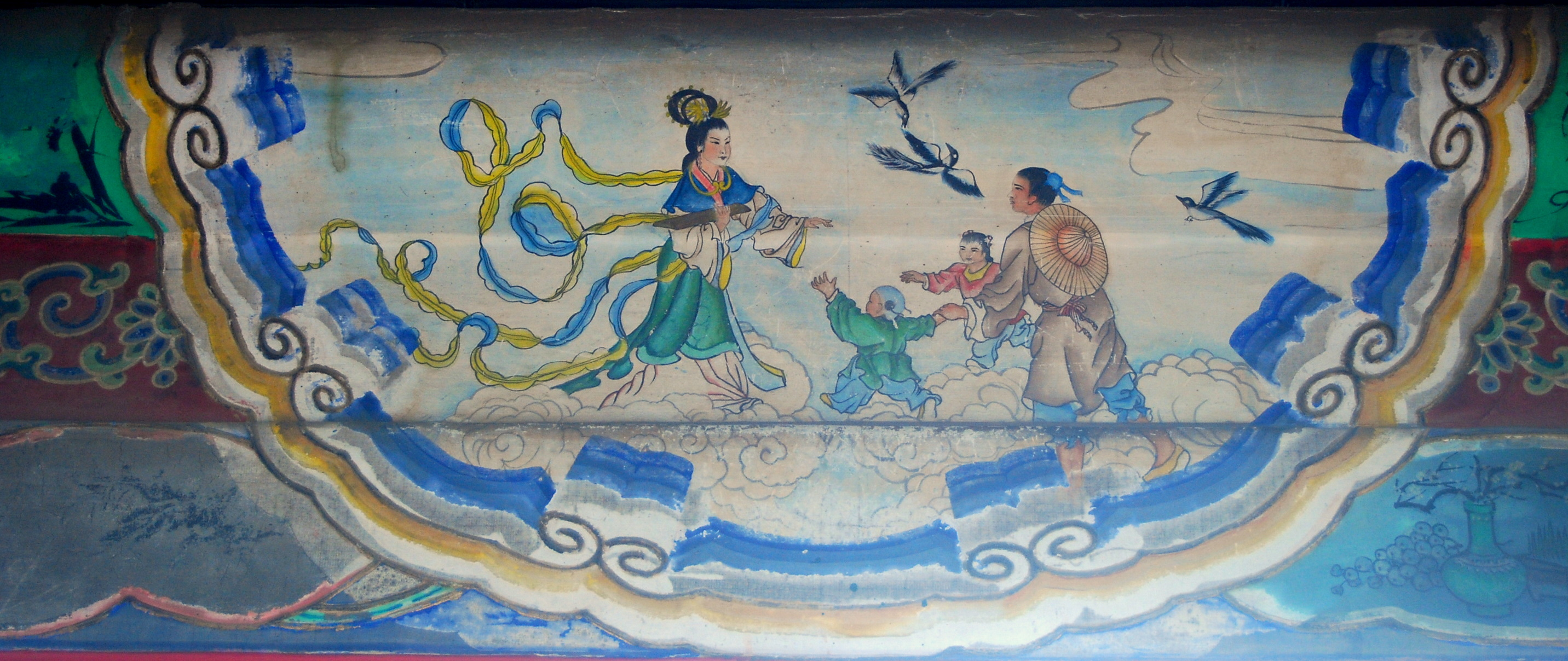
- The reunion of the couple on the bridge of magpies. Artwork in the Long Corridor of the Summer Palace, Beijing
- Traditional Chinese: 牛郎織女
- Simplified Chinese: 牛郎织女
- Literal meaning: Cowherd [and] Weaver Girl
Transcriptions
Standard Mandarin
- Hanyu Pinyin: Niúláng Zhīnǚ

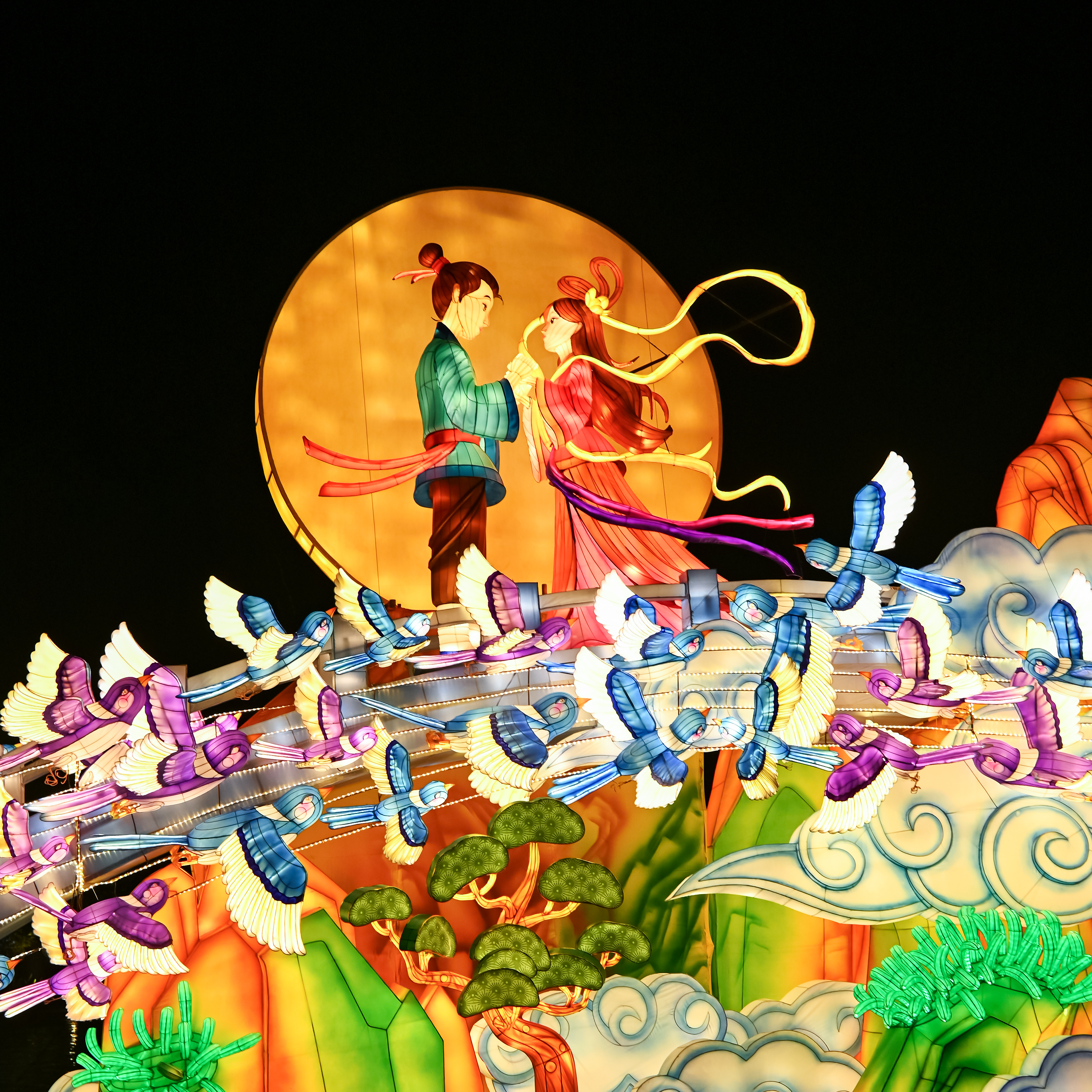
The Cowherd and the Weaver Girl meeting on the magpie bridge.

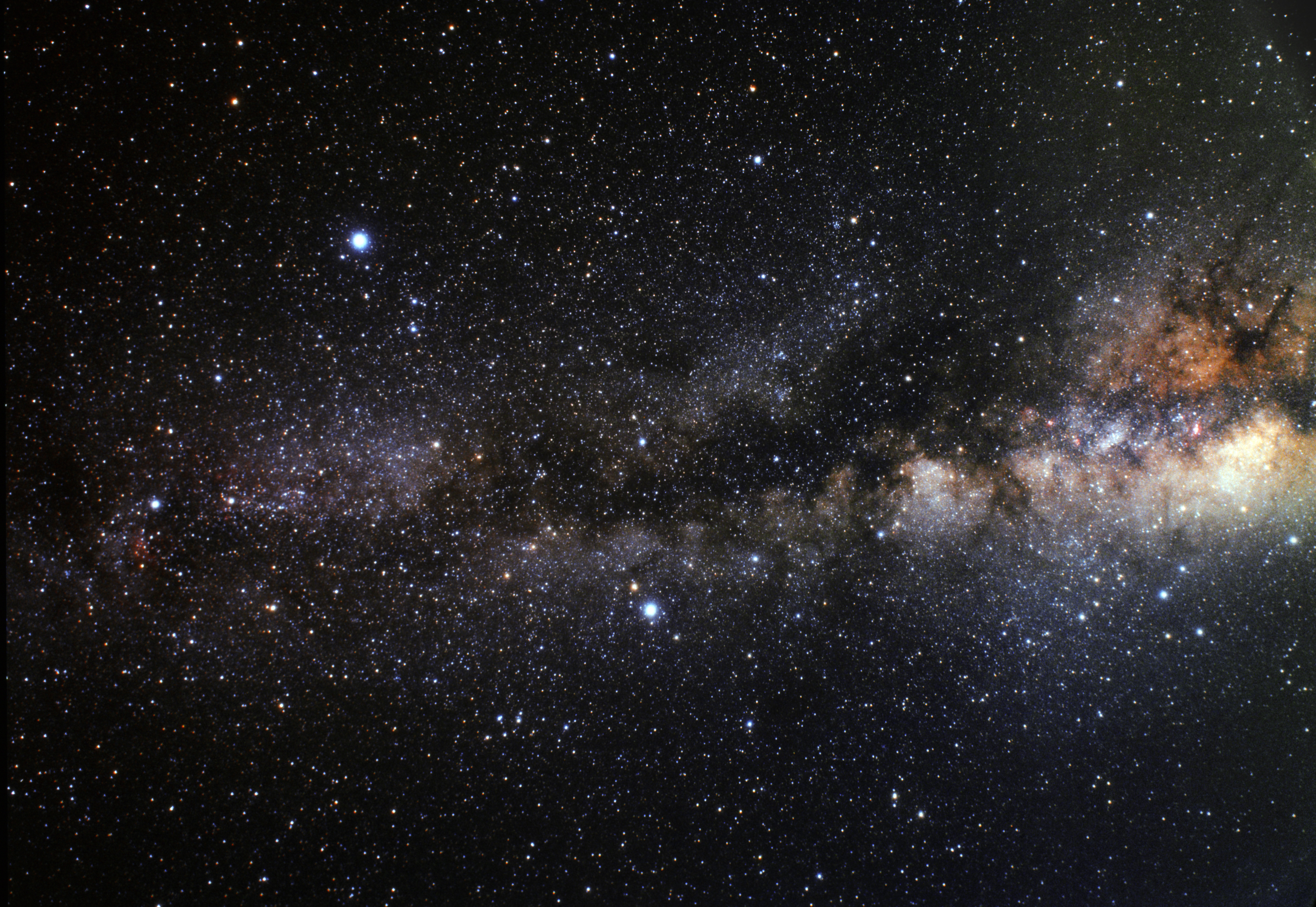
View of the night sky: Vega (Zhinü the weaver-girl) is at top left, Altair (Niulang the cowherd) at lower centre. The heavenly river (Milky Way) separates them.

The Cowherd and the Weaver Girl are characters found in Chinese mythology who appear eponymously in a romantic Chinese folk tale. The story tells of the romance between Zhinü the weaver girl, symbolized by the star Vega, and Niulang the cowherd, symbolized by the star Altair. Despite their love for each other, their romance was forbidden, and thus they were banished to opposite sides of the heavenly river (symbolizing the Milky Way). Once a year, on the seventh day of the seventh lunar month, a flock of magpies would form a bridge to reunite the lovers for a single day. Though there are many variations of the story, the earliest-known reference to this famous myth dates back to a poem from the Classic of Poetry from over 2600 years ago.

The Cowherd and the Weaver Girl originated from people's worship of natural celestial phenomena and later developed into the Qiqiao or Qixi Festival during the Han dynasty. It has also been celebrated as the Tanabata festival in Japan and the Chilseok festival in Korea. In ancient times, women would make wishes to the stars of Vega and Altair in the sky during the festival, hoping to have a wise mind, a dexterous hand (in embroidery and other household tasks), and a good marriage.

The story was selected as one of China's Four Great Folktales by the "Folklore Movement" in the 1920s —the others being the Legend of the White Snake, Lady Meng Jiang, and Liang Shanbo and Zhu Yingtai. Idema (2012) notes that this term neglects the variations and therefore the diversity of the tale, as one single version was taken as the true version.

The Cowherd and the Weaver Girl and its two main characters remain popular in various parts of Asia and elsewhere, with different places adopting different variations. Some historical and cross cultural similarities to other stories have also been observed. The story is referenced in various literary and popular cultural sources.

== Earliest known reference ==
詩經 · 小雅 · 大東

...

維天有漢，
監亦有光。
跂彼織女，
終日七襄。

雖則七襄，
不成報章。
睆彼牽牛，
不以服箱。

...

Translation:

Poem 203, Lesser Court Hymns, Classic of Poetry

(...)

In Heavens there is the Milky Way,
It looks down and is bright;
slanting is the Weaving Lady,
during one day she is seven times removed.

Although she is seven times removed,
she does not achieve any interwoven pattern;
brilliant is the Draught Ox,
But one does not yoke into any carriage.

(...)

== Later literature ==
The tale has been alluded to in many literary works. Du Fu (712–770) of the Tang dynasty wrote a poem called The Heavenly River:

天河

常時任顯晦，
秋至輒分明。
縱被微雲掩，
終能永夜清。
含星動雙闕，
伴月落邊城。
牛女年年渡，
何曾風浪生。

Translation:

The Heavenly River

Most of the time it may be hidden or fully visible,
but when autumn comes, it gets immediately bright.
Even if covered over by faint clouds,
in the long run it can be clear through the long night.
Full of stars, it stirs by paired palace gates,
moon’s companion, it sinks by a frontier fort.
Oxherd and Weaver cross it every year,
and when have storms ever arisen thereon?

One of the most famous derivatives is a poem by Qin Guan (1049–1100) during the Song dynasty:

鵲橋仙

纖雲弄巧，
飛星傳恨，
銀漢迢迢暗渡。
金風玉露一相逢，
便勝卻人間無數。
柔情似水，
佳期如夢，
忍顧鵲橋歸路。
兩情若是久長時，
又豈在朝朝暮暮。

Translation:

Meeting across the Milky way

Through the varying shapes of the delicate clouds,
the sad message of the shooting stars,
a silent journey across the Milky Way.
One meeting of the Cowherd and Weaver amidst the golden autumn wind and jade-glistening dew,
eclipses the countless meetings in the mundane world.
The feelings soft as water,
the ecstatic moment unreal as a dream,
how can one have the heart to go back on the bridge made of magpies?
If the two hearts are united forever,
why do the two persons need to stay together—day after day, night after night?

== Analysis ==
=== Influence and variations ===
The story of the cowherd and weaver girl spread across Asia, with different variations appearing in various languages and regions over the course of time. In Southeast Asia, the story has been conflated into a Jataka tale detailing the story of Manohara, the youngest of seven daughters of the Kinnara King, who lives on Mount Kailash and falls in love with Prince Sudhana.

In Korea, the story focuses on Jiknyeo, a weaver girl who falls in love with Gyeonwoo, a herder. In Japan, the story revolves around the romance between the deities, Orihime and Hikoboshi. In Vietnam, the story is known as Ngưu Lang Chức Nữ and Ông Ngâu Bà Ngâu, and revolves around the story of Chức Nữ, the weaver, and Ngưu Lang, the herder of buffalos. The Vietnamese version is also titled The Weaver Fairy and the Buffalo Boy.

=== Tale type ===
In the first catalogue of Chinese folktales (devised in 1937), Wolfram Eberhard abstracted a Chinese folktype indexed as number 34, Schwanenjungfrau ("The Swan Maiden"): a poor human youth is directed to the place where supernatural women bathe by a cow or a deer; the women may be Swan Maidens, a celestial weaver, one of the Pleiades, one of the "9 Celestial Maidens", or a fairy; he steals the garments of one of them and makes her his wife; she finds the garments and flies back to Heaven; the youth goes after her, and meets her in the Heavenly realm; the Heavenly king decrees that the couple shall meet only once a year. Based on some of the variants available then, Eberhard dated the story to the 5th century, although the tale seems much older, with references to it in the Huainanzi (2nd century BC). Eberhard also supposed that the fairy tale preceded the astral myth.

Chinese folklorist and scholar Ting Nai-tung classified the versions of The Cowherd and the Weaver Girl under the Aarne–Thompson–Uther Index tale type ATU 400, "The Quest for the Lost Wife". The tale also holds similarities with widespread tales of the swan maiden (bird maiden or bird princess).

== Cultural references ==
- Sun Wukong shapeshifts into the Cowherd to prank the Weaver Girl in the 1976 Taiwanese movie Monkey King with 72 Magic (《新孫悟空72變》)
- Reference to the story was made by Carl Sagan in his book Contact.
- Episode 63 of the 1981–1986 Japanese anime Dr. Slump – Arale-chan, based on the manga Dr. Slump by Akira Toriyama, parodies the tale.
- The story, as well as the puppetry shown, was told by Meiying to Dre Parker during the Qi Xi Festival in the film The Karate Kid.
- The tale and the Tanabata festival are also the basis of the Sailor Moon side story entitled "Chibiusa's Picture Diary - Beware the Tanabata!", where both Vega and Altair make an appearance.
- The post-hardcore band La Dispute named and partially based their first album, Somewhere at the Bottom of the River Between Vega and Altair, after the tale.
- The JRPG Bravely Second: End Layer also uses the names Vega and Altair for a pair of story-important characters who shared a love interest in each other years before the game's story began, Deneb being their common friend.
- The K-pop girl group Red Velvet's song "One of These Nights" from their 2016 EP The Velvet also references the legend of the two lovers.
- J-pop band Supercell also references the story on its song "Kimi no Shiranai Monogatari".
- The novel Bridge of Birds by Barry Hughart is centered around the tale, but incorporates many more Chinese folk stories while retelling the tale.
- Korean girl group Dreamcatcher's song "July 7th" from their EP Alone in the City, is based on this tale.
- The South Korean television series Vincenzo features a reference to the legend of the lovers, in which Vincenzo mixes up the names from the Korean tale.
- In the twelfth Magic Tree House book, Day of the Dragon King, Jack and Annie save this story from Emperor Qin's book burning, then use it to escape the emperor's mausoleum.
- In The Big Bang Theory, S07E19 "The Indecision Amalgamation", Raj references the story to Penny as a romantic folk tale.
- The K-pop boy group Treasure's song "Bling Like This", the b-side track from their second single album The First Step: Chapter Two is also based on this story.
- The book Where The Mountain Meets The Moon by author Grace Lin bases Buffalo Boy and the Goddess of Weaving on this tale.
- The Japanese rock group Alice Nine's song "Heisei Jyuushichinen Shichigatsu Nanoka" from their 2005 EP Alice in Wonderland is based on this story.
- This story is also mentioned periodically throughout When Life Gives You Tangerines.
- R.F. Kuang's novel Katabasis makes mention of the story as a plot point.

Similar to the Chang'e space program being named after the Chinese goddess of the moon, the Queqiao and Queqiao-2 relay satellite is named after the "bridge of magpies" from the Chinese tale of the cowherd and weaver girl. The Chang'e 4 landing site is known as Statio Tianhe, which refers to the heavenly river in the tale. The nearby far-side lunar craters Zhinyu and Hegu are named after Chinese constellations associated with the weaver girl and the cowherd.

In Japan, the Engineering Test Satellite VII mission was an automated rendezvous and docking test of two satellites nicknamed "Orihime" and "Hikoboshi."

== Gallery ==
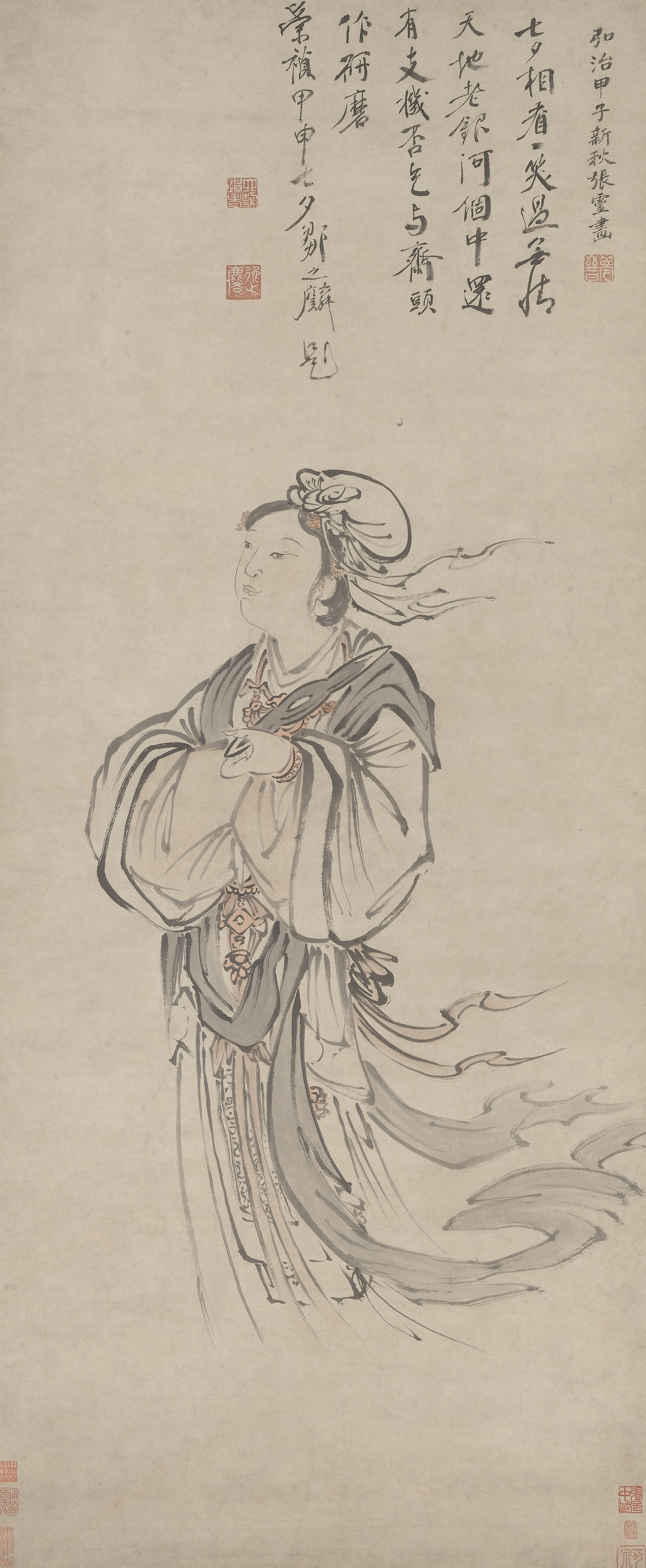
Zhinü with a shuttle in her hand, painted by Zhang Ling, Ming dynasty

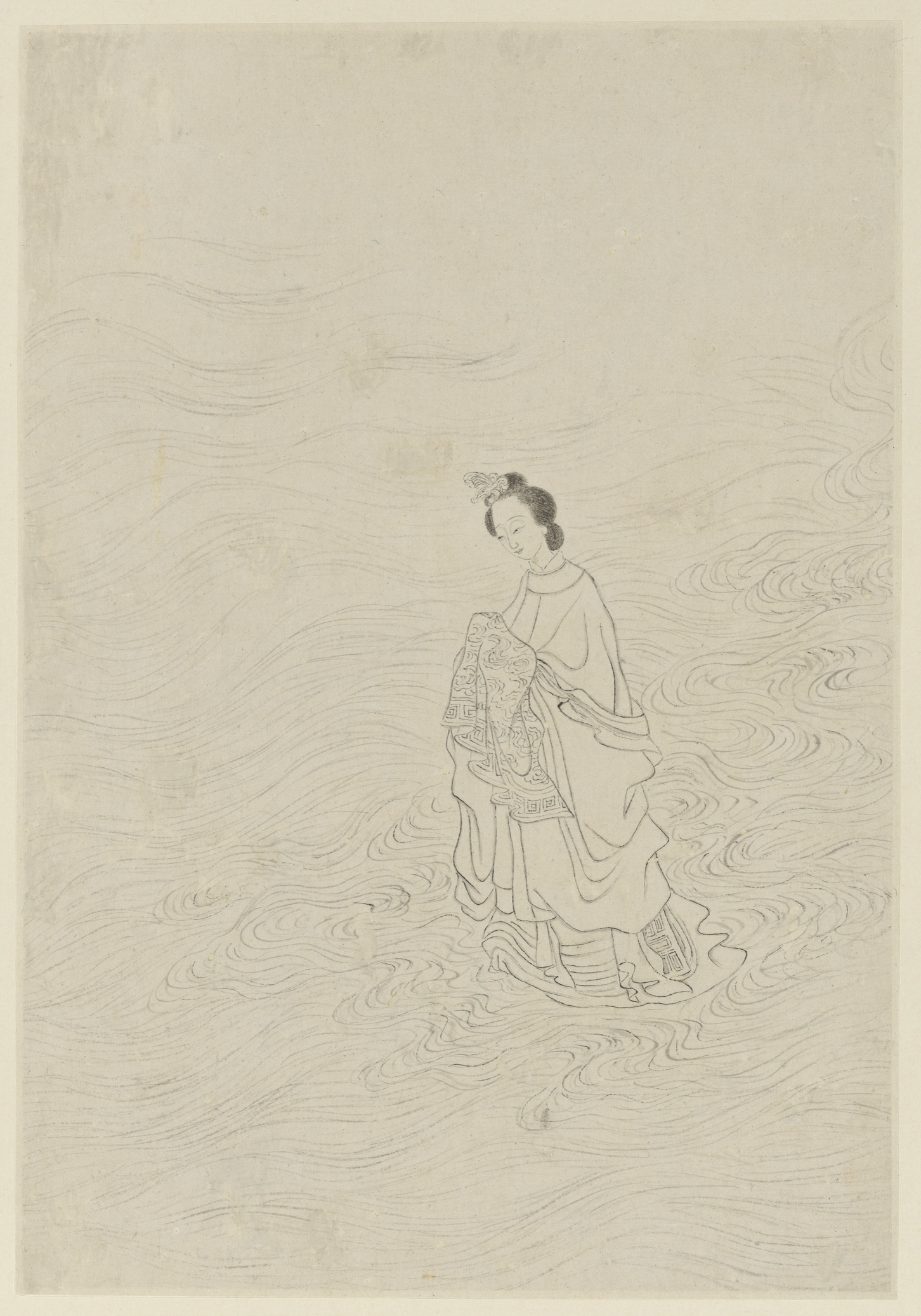
Zhinü crossing the River of Heaven, as painted by Gai Qi, 1799

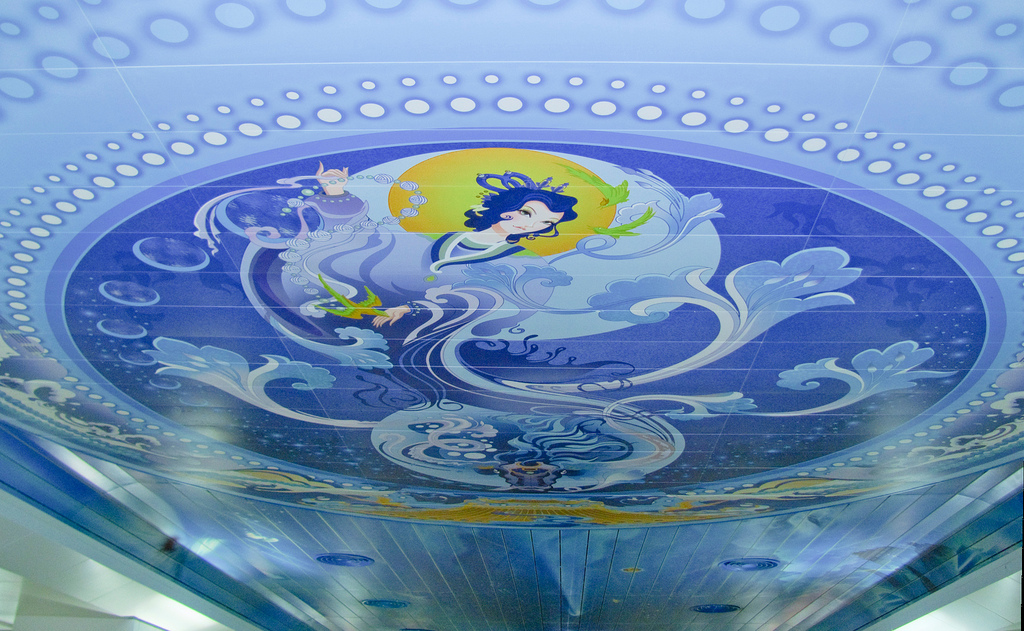
Zhinü as depicted on the ceiling of Muxuyuan Station, Nanjing

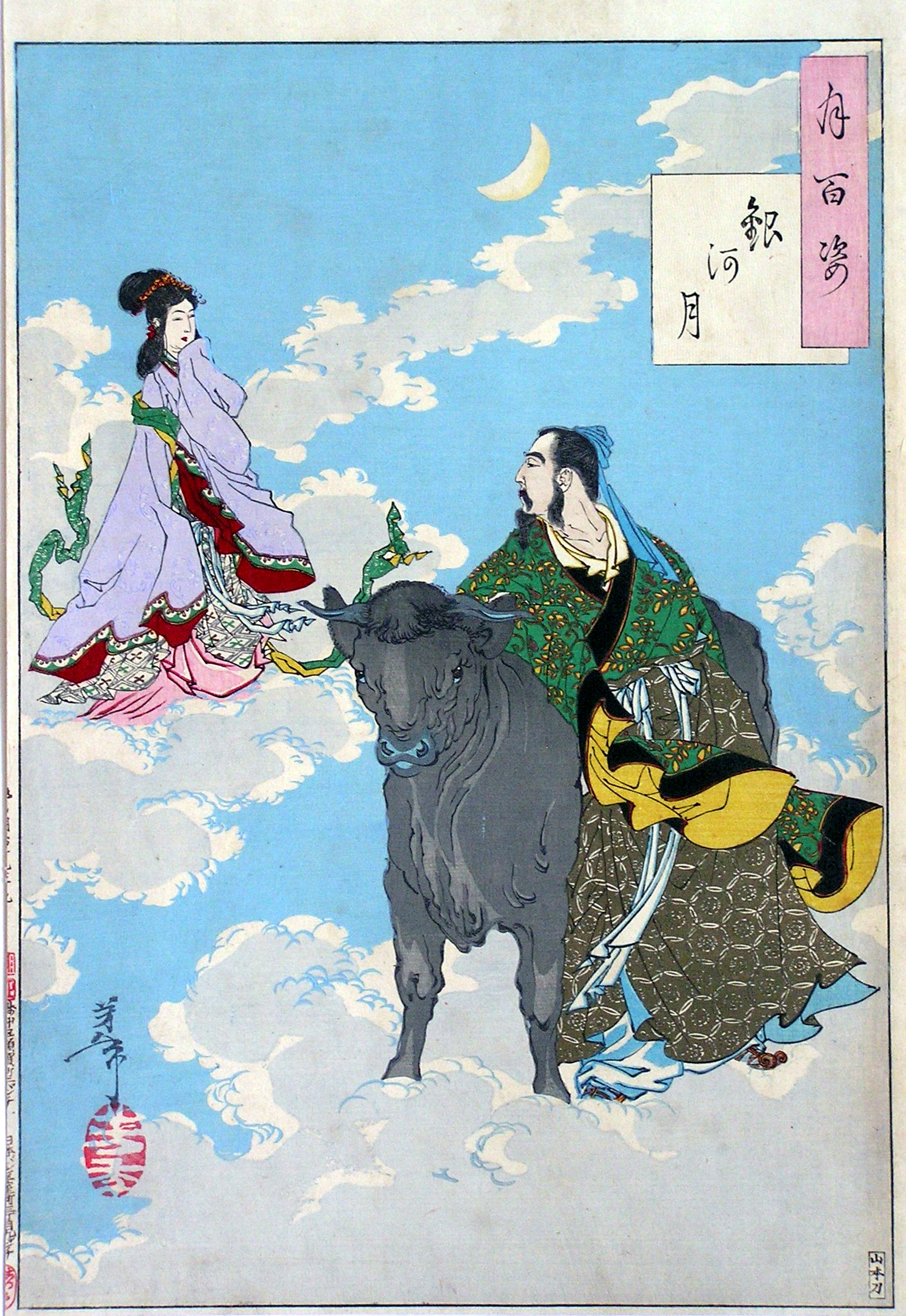
Zhinü and Niulang, by the Japanese painter Tsukioka Yoshitoshi

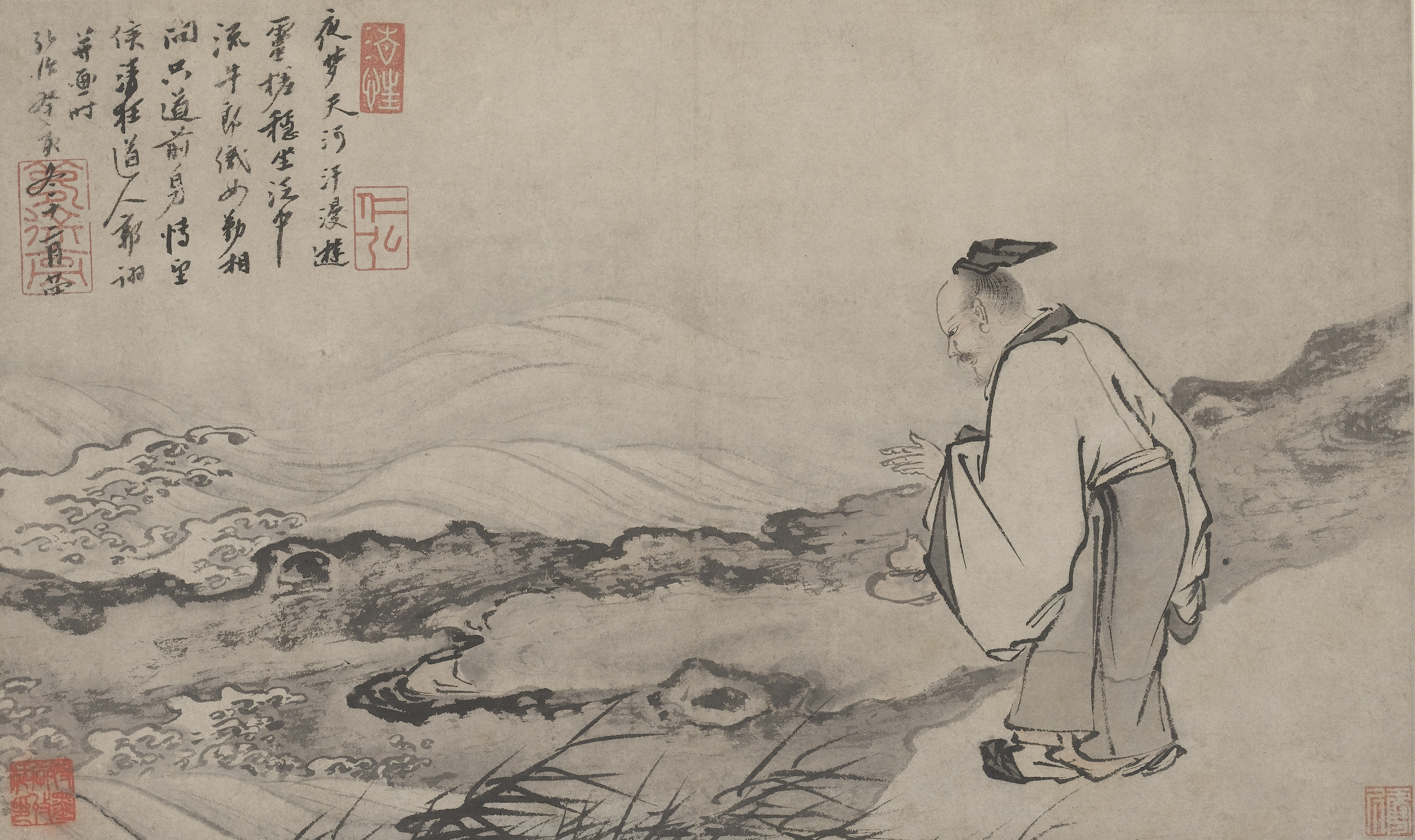
Depiction of the creation of the River of Heaven (Milky Way), painted by Guo Xu, Ming dynasty

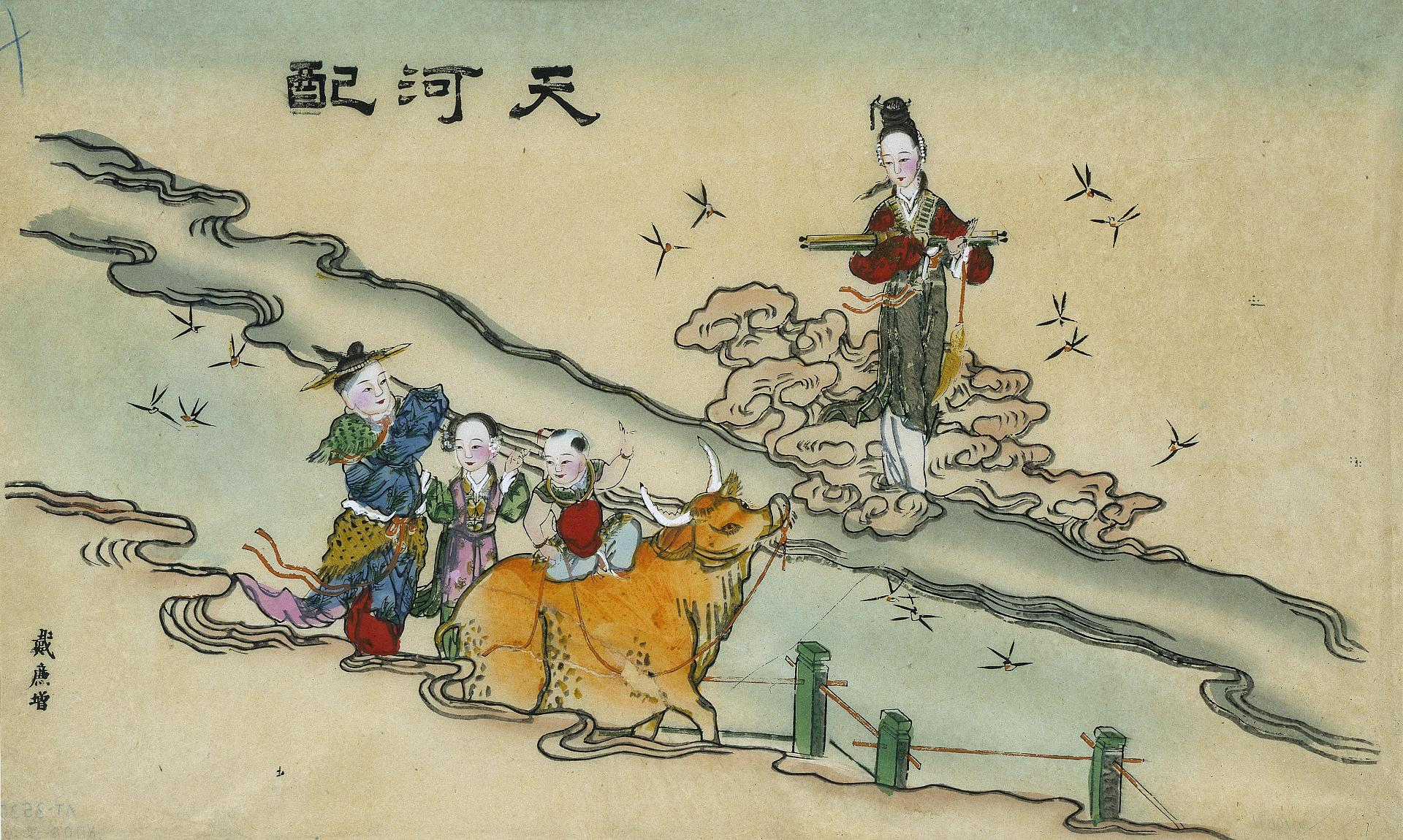
Rendezvous in the Milky Way

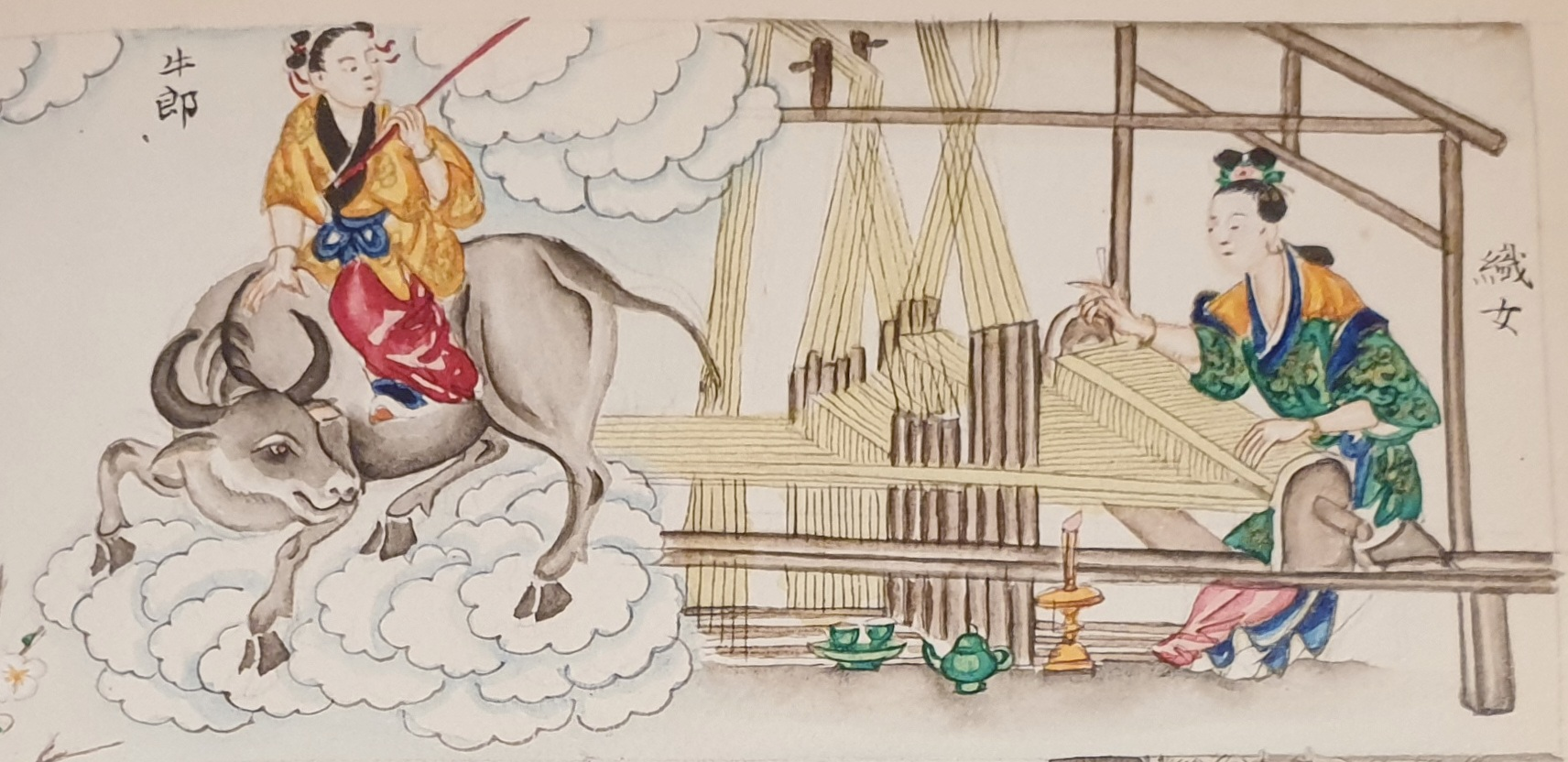
The painting of Niulang and Zhinü in the book Vân tiên cổ tích truyện of the Nguyễn dynasty by Lê Đức Trạch

== See also ==
- Qixi Festival
- Tanabata Festival
- Chilseok Festival
- Ladyhawke (film), a similar story
