= Fei Danxu =

Chinese artist (1801–1850)

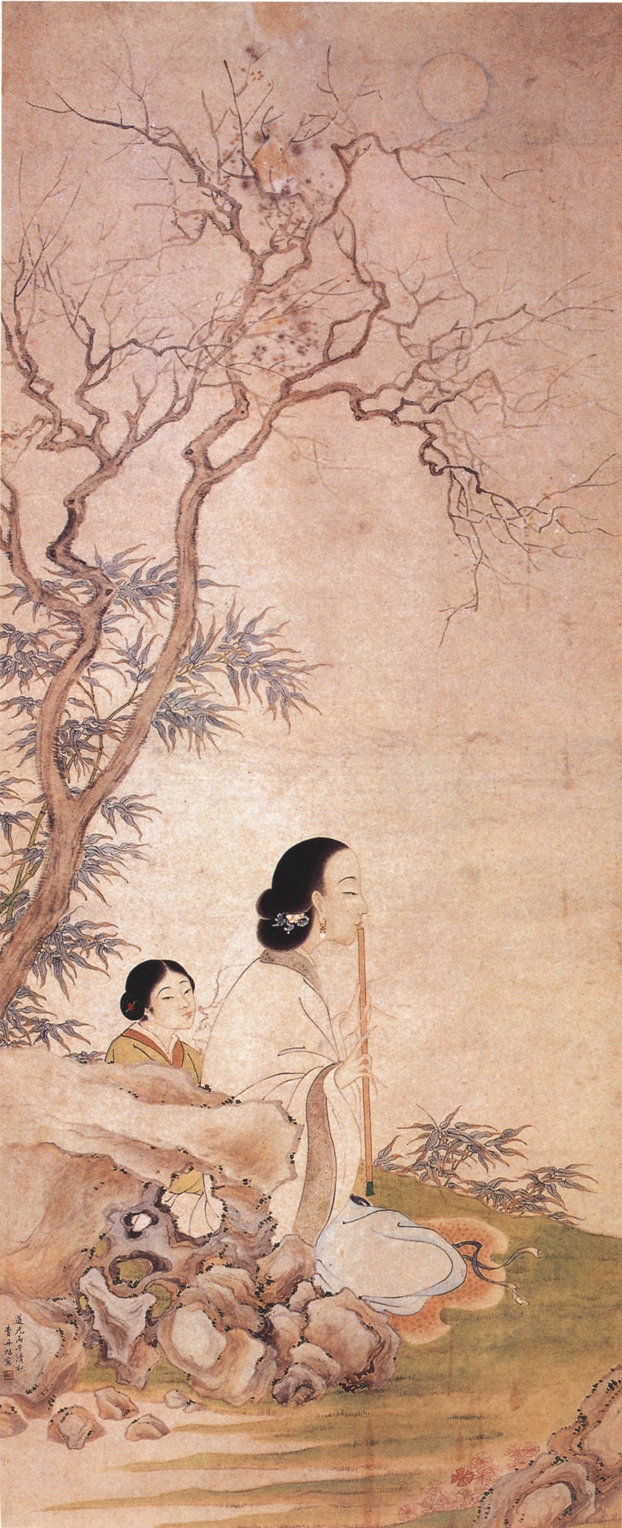
Playing Flute under the Moon

Fei Danxu (simplified Chinese: 费丹旭; traditional Chinese: 費丹旭; pinyin: Fèi Dānxù; Wade–Giles: Fei Tan-hsü; 1801–1850) was an itinerant Chinese painter during the Qing Dynasty.

Fei's courtesy name was Zitiao (子苕), and his art names were Xiaolou (晓楼) and Huanxisheng (环溪生). A later pseudonym was Ouweng (偶翁). He was a native of Wucheng (乌程 - now Wuxing, Zhejiang).

Fei began painting when he was very young in Wucheng. He later traveled throughout Zhejiang and Jiangsu provinces to practiced his art. He is most noted for his paintings of beautiful women. Among his paintings of beautiful women is "Twelve Beauties of Jinling," which features twelve of the major female characters in the novel Dream of the Red Chamber.

He was often associated with the painter Gai Qi in what was known as the "Gai Fei" school. Fei's younger brother Dancheng, as well as his sons and grandsons, continued the tradition of painting beautiful women, as did Gai Qi's grandson.

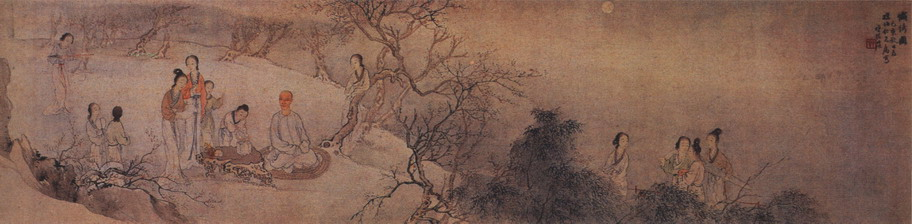
Yao Xie and his Wives (姚燮忏绮图). Handscroll, ink and color on paper. 31 x 128.9 cm. Palace Museum, Beijing
