= Zhinü =

Chinese goddess

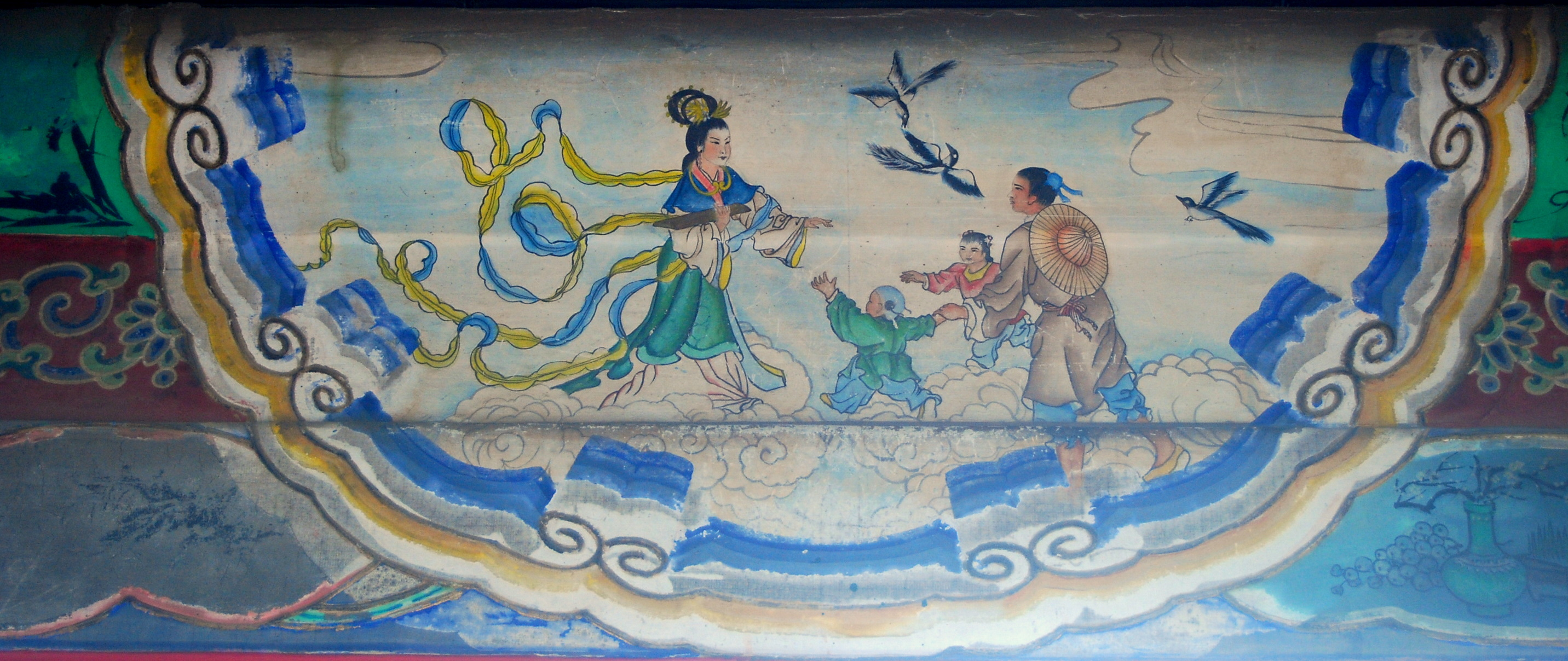
- An illustration of the couple at the Long Corridor of the Summer Palace, Beijing

Chinese name
- Traditional Chinese: 織女
- Simplified Chinese: 织女
- Literal meaning: The Weaver Girl
Transcriptions
Standard Mandarin
- Hanyu Pinyin: Zhīnǚ

Japanese name
- Kanji: 織姫
Transcriptions
- Romanization: Orihime

Zhinü is the goddess of weaving and the star Vega in Chinese mythology. She was the youngest of seven daughters of the Jade Emperor and Queen Mother of the West. It is believed that she wove her father’s royal robes out of the clouds. She is identified as the star Vega in the constellation Lyra.

Zhinü was a legendary figure and main character in the popular Chinese folk tale The Cowherd and the Weaver Girl. The earliest record of this myth is traced to over 2600 years ago.

== Legend ==
Zhinü was the seventh daughter of the Jade Emperor. One day she came down to Earth and, while bathing in a river, met Niulang, a cowherd. Niulang was so amazed by her beauty that he instantly fell in love with her and stole her clothes. Without her clothes, Zhinü was unable to return to heaven. Instead, she decided to marry Niulang. Niulang farmed in the fields while Zhinü weaved at home and took care of their children. Zhinü was so deeply in love and for so long that she no longer desired a return to heaven. However, their relationship was discovered by her father, Jade Emperor, who ordered the Queen Mother of the West to bring Zhinü back to Heaven. Niulang was very upset when he found out his wife had been taken back to heaven. Niulang's ox, who saw the events unfold, built a boat for him to carry his children up to Heaven. The ox was once the god of cattle but was punished after he had violated the laws of Heaven.

Just when Niulang and his sons were about to reach Heaven, the Queen Mother of the West punished them by creating the River of Heaven, or Milky Way, across the middle of the sky, separating the two lovers forever. Heartbroken, Zhinü became the star Vega and Niulang the star Altair.

Eventually, the Queen Mother of the West allowed them to meet once a year on the seventh day of the seventh month when a flock of magpies swarm into the sky and create a bridge for them to cross. The day is celebrated as the "Qixi Festival", also known as China's Valentine’s Day. Today the Chinese phrase "Niulang Zhinü" is commonly used to describe loving married couples.

The story was selected as one of China's Four Great Folktales by the "Folklore Movement" in the 1920s—the others being the Legend of the White Snake, Lady Meng Jiang, and Liang Shanbo and Zhu Yingtai.

== Gallery ==
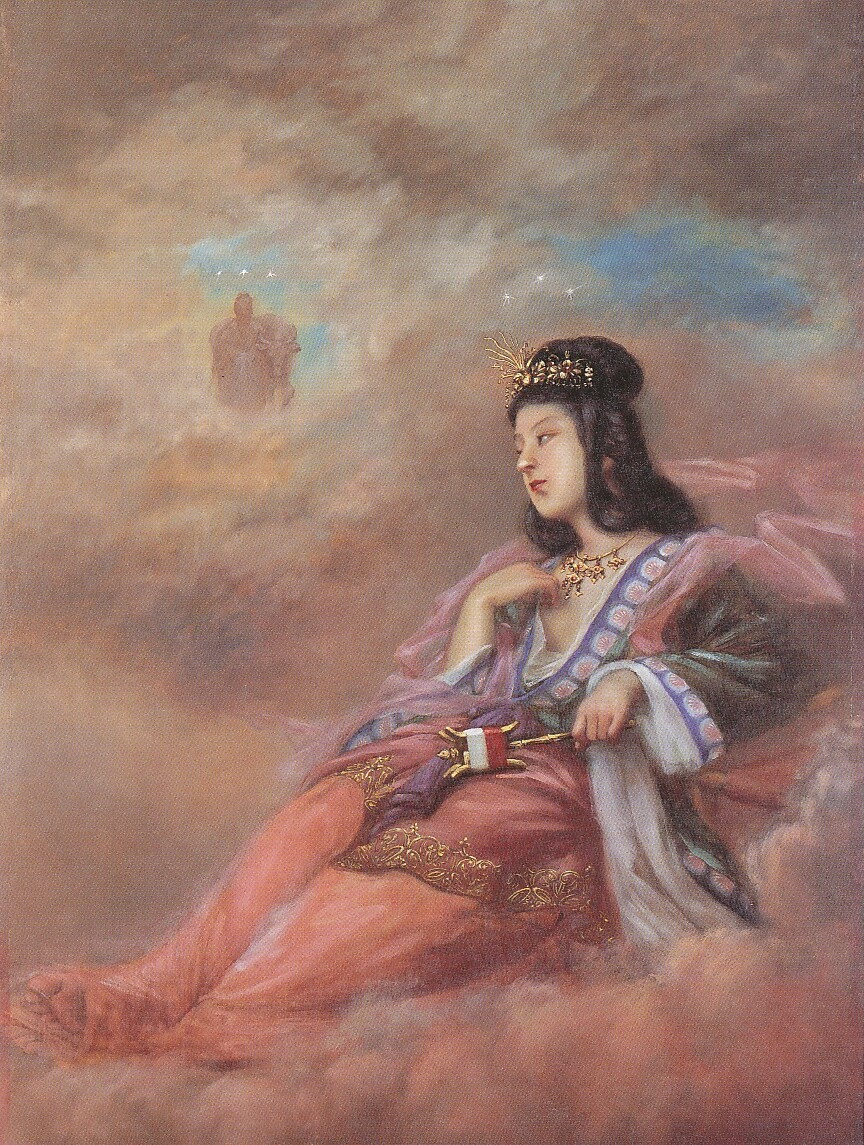
A painting by Yamamoto Hōsui in 1892.

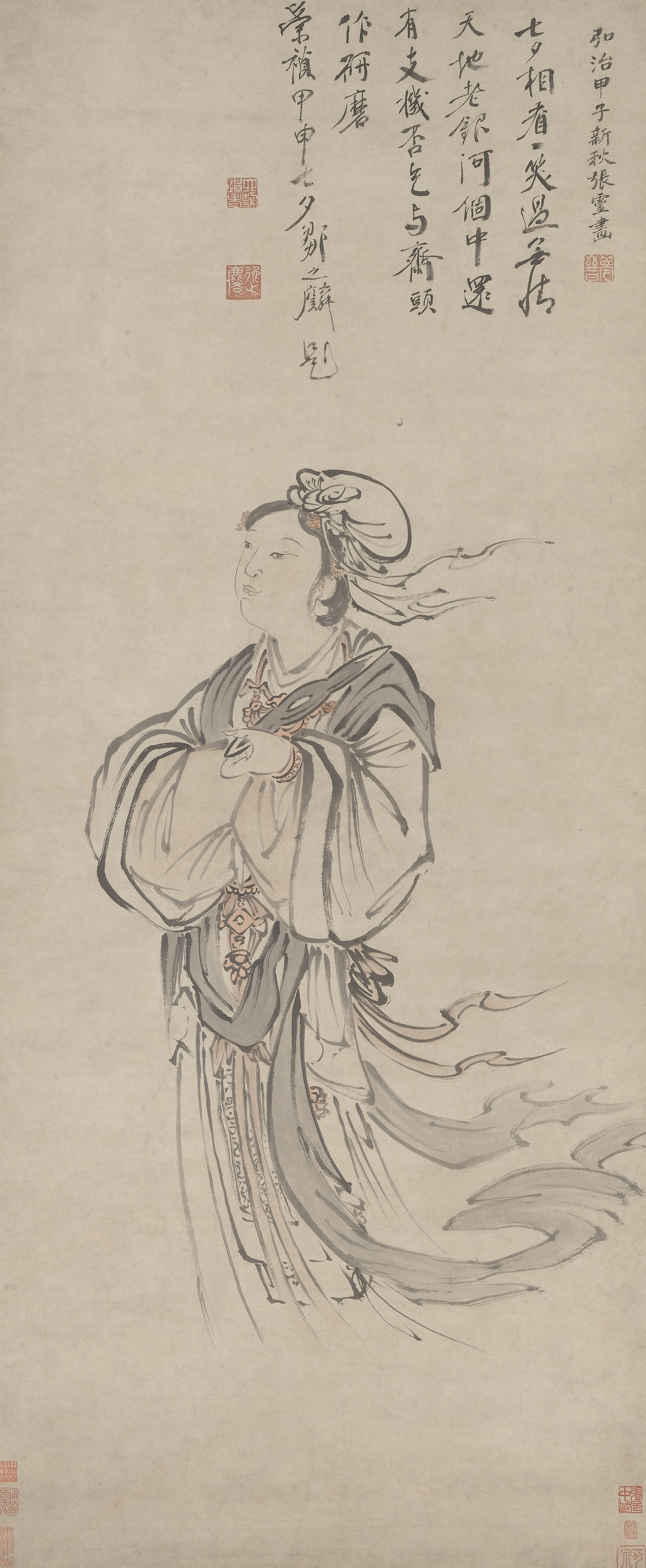
Zhinü with a shuttle in her hand, painted by Zhang Ling, Ming dynasty.

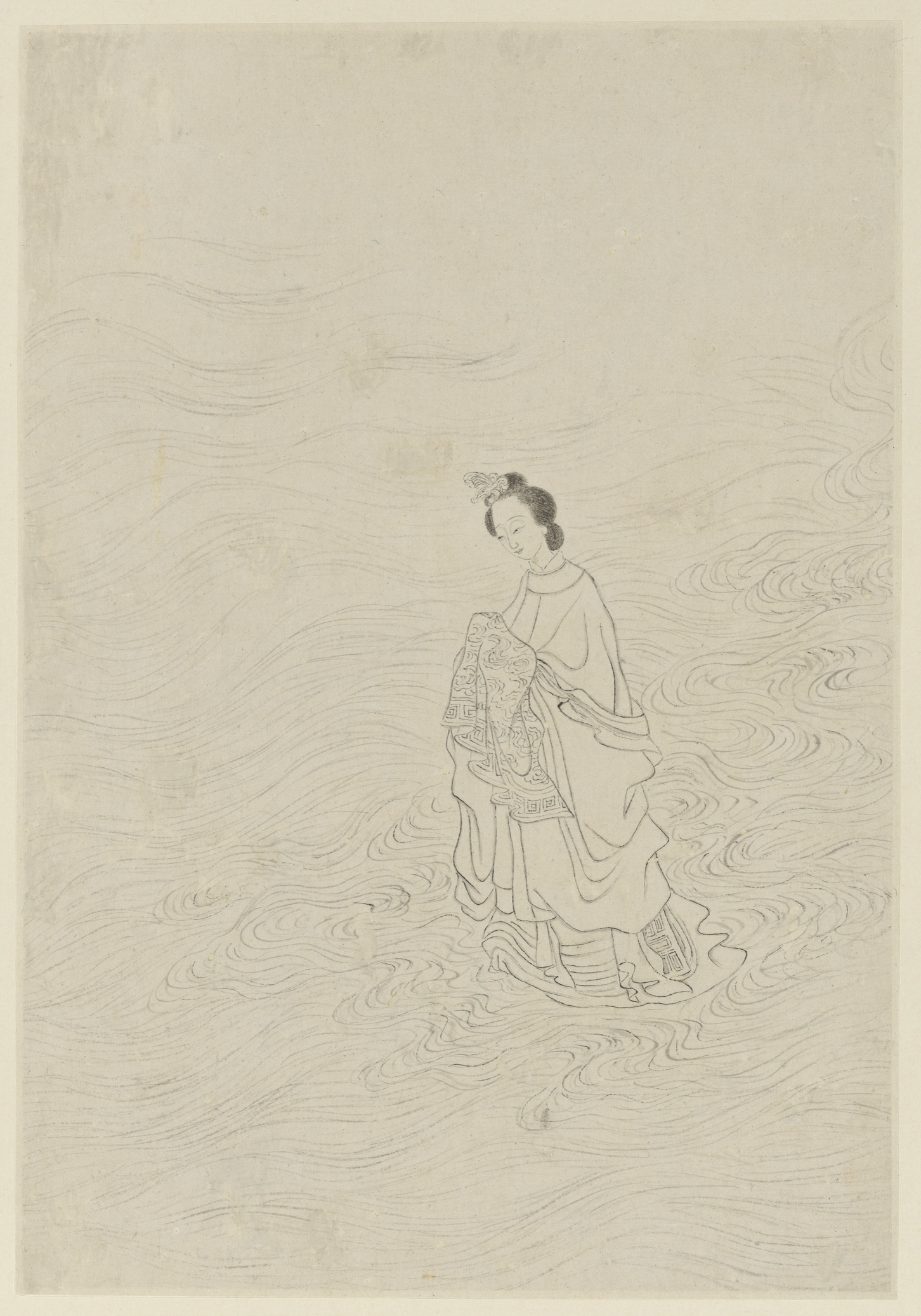
Zhinü crossing the River of Heaven, as painted by Gai Qi, 1799.

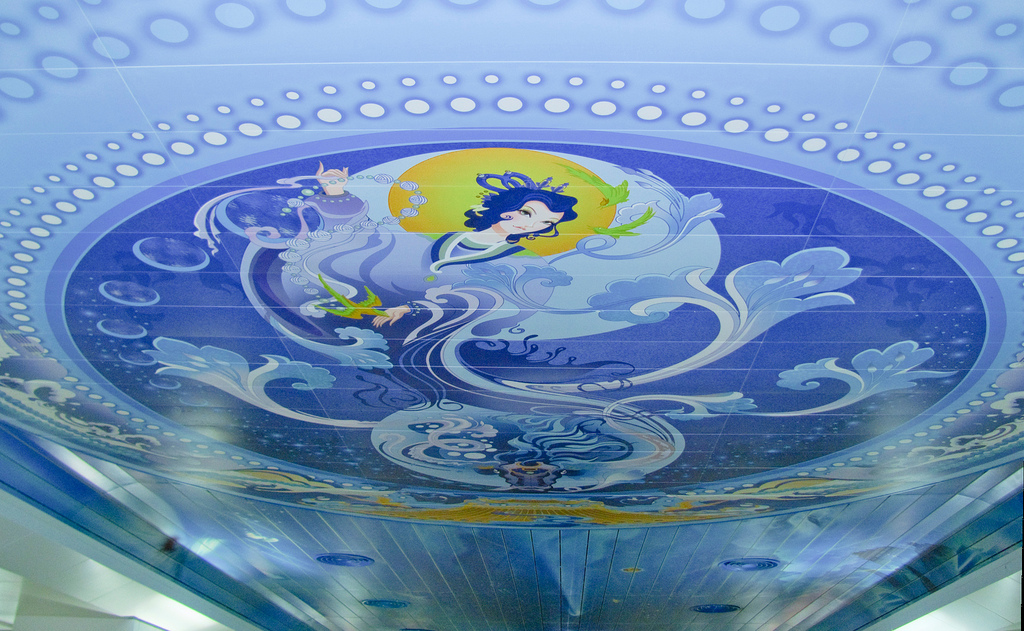
Zhinü as depicted on the ceiling of Muxuyuan Station, Nanjing.

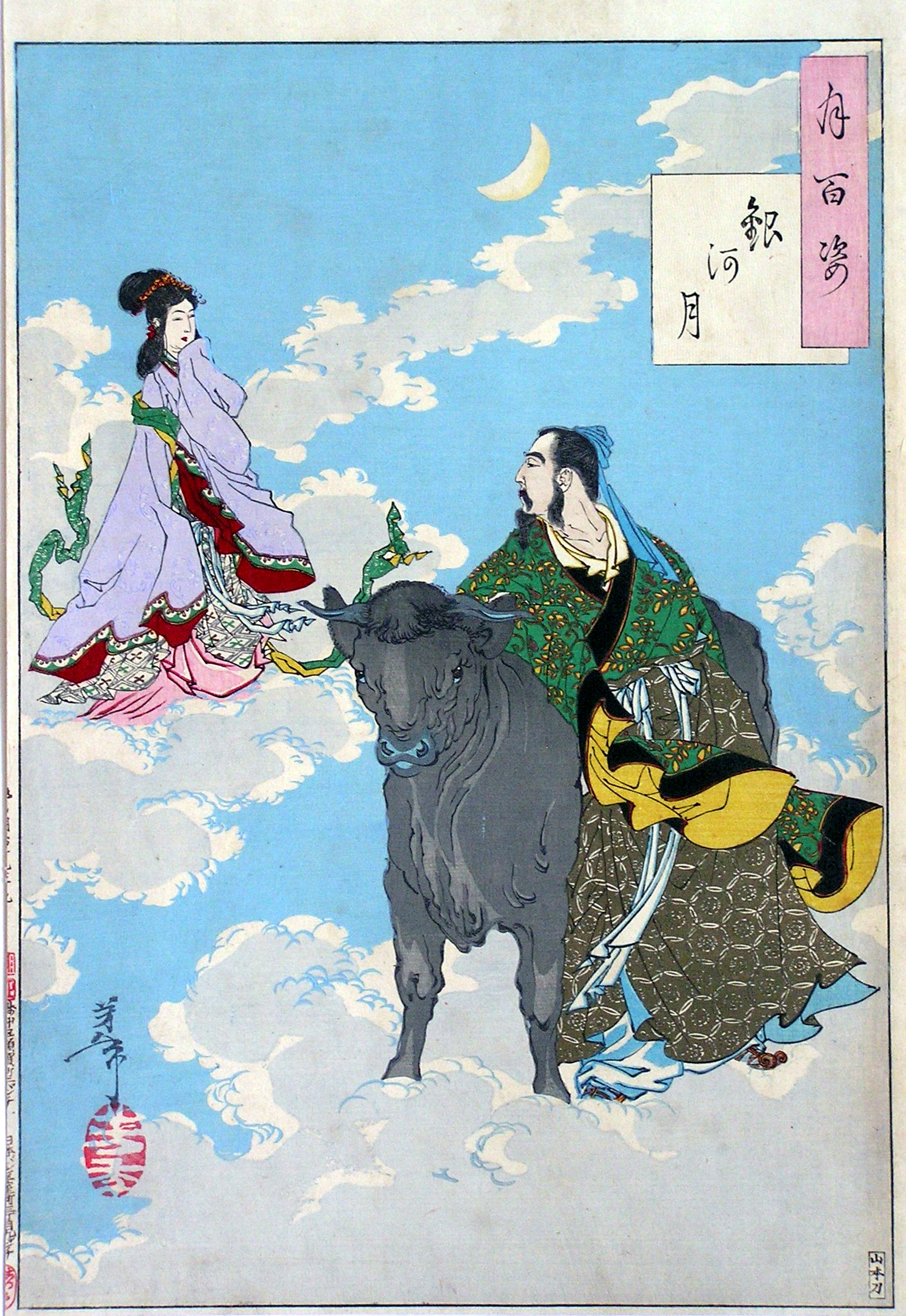
Zhinü and Niulang, by the Japanese painter Tsukioka Yoshitoshi.

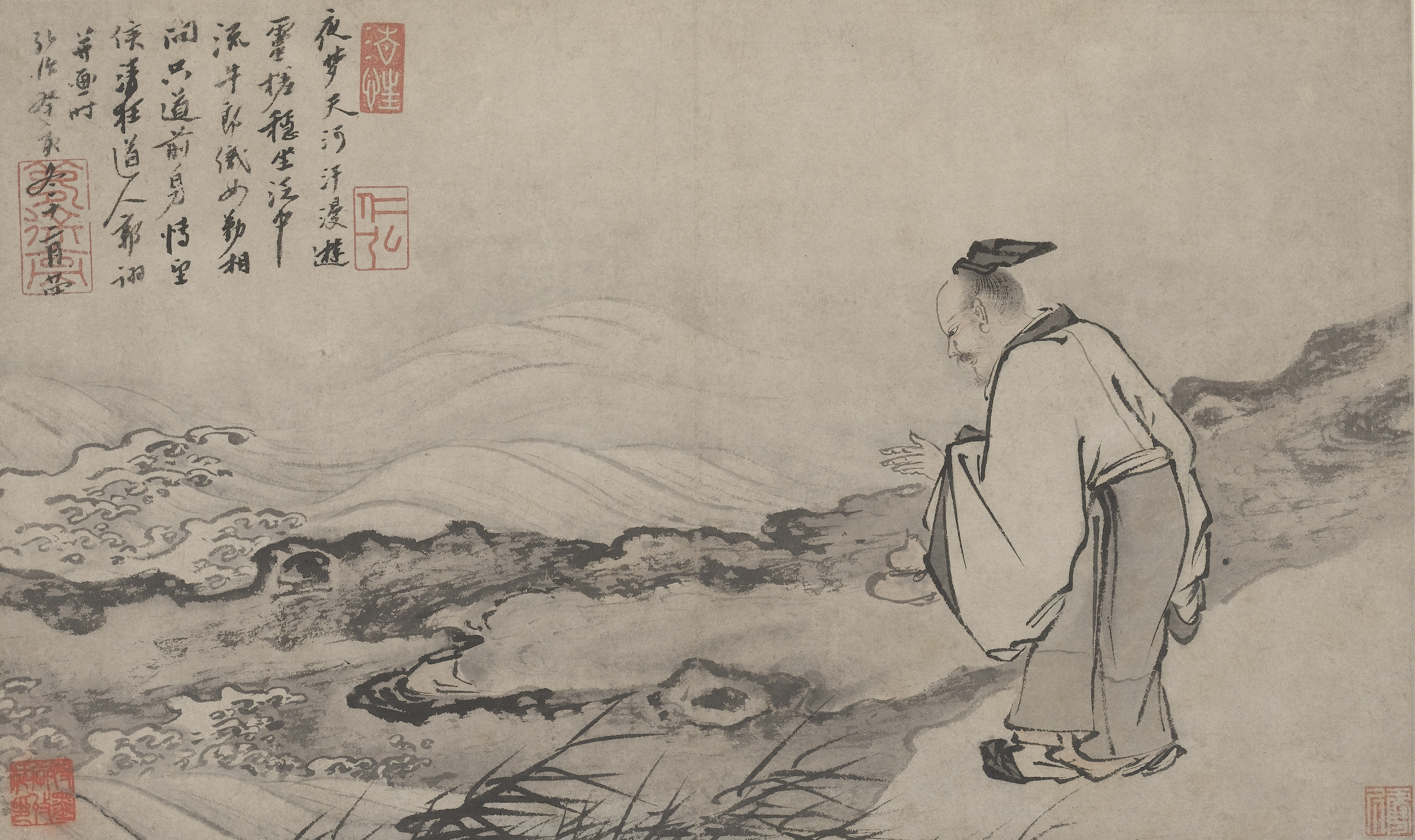
Depiction of the creation of the River of Heaven (Milky Way), painted by Guo Xu, Ming dynasty.

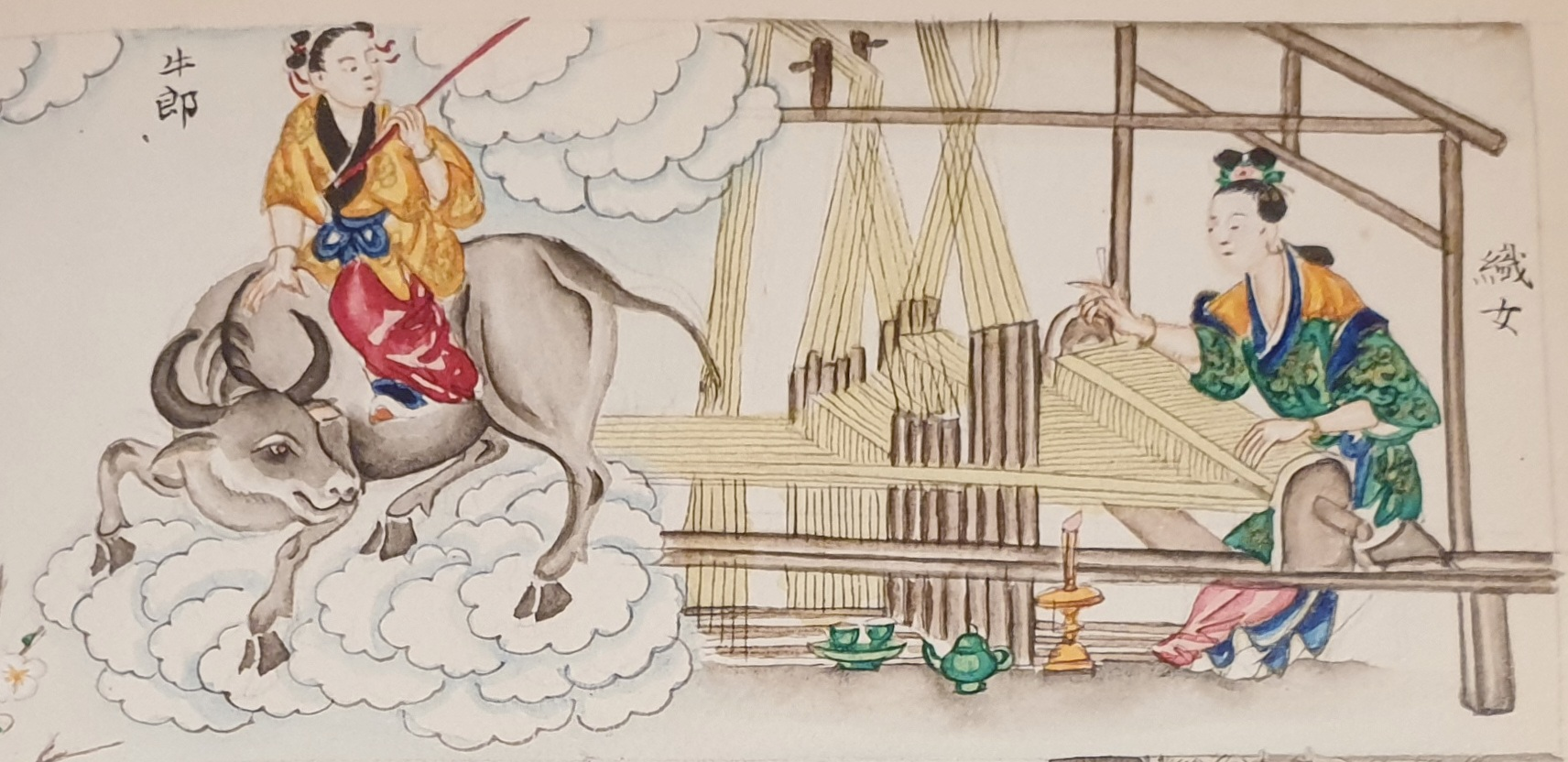
The painting of Niulang - Zhinü in the book Vân tiên cổ tích truyện of the Nguyễn dynasty by Lê Đức Trạch.

== See also ==
- Qixi Festival
