= Niulang =

Chinese deity

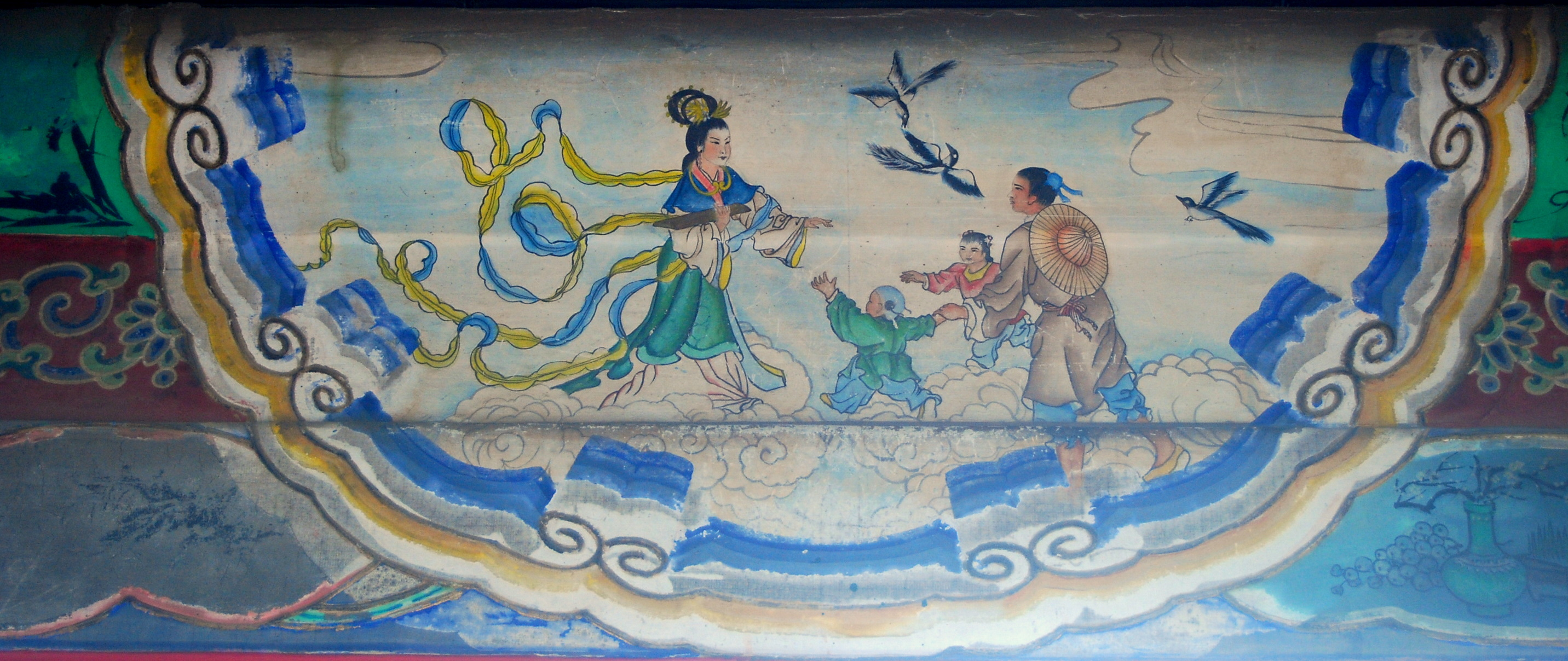
- An illustration of the couple at the Long Corridor of the Summer Palace, Beijing
- Traditional Chinese: 牛郎
- Simplified Chinese: 牛郎
- Literal meaning: The Cowherd
Transcriptions
Standard Mandarin
- Hanyu Pinyin: Niú-láng

Niulang is a Chinese deity who is identified as the star Altair in the constellation Aquila. He was a legendary figure and main character in the popular Chinese folk tale The Cowherd and the Weaver Girl. The earliest record of this myth is traced to over 2600 years ago.

== Legend ==
Some legend said that Niulang and Zhinü were actually gods on Heaven. Niulang is responsible for the celestial herds. Zhinü is the seventh daughter of the Jade Emperor. They fell in love and were banished from Heaven because celestial laws forbade their romance. Zhinü was punished by her father and forced to weave colorful clouds all day long. Niulang was reincarnated as a cowherd on earth who lost his parents at a young age and lived with his older brother and sister-in-law, and their story begins.

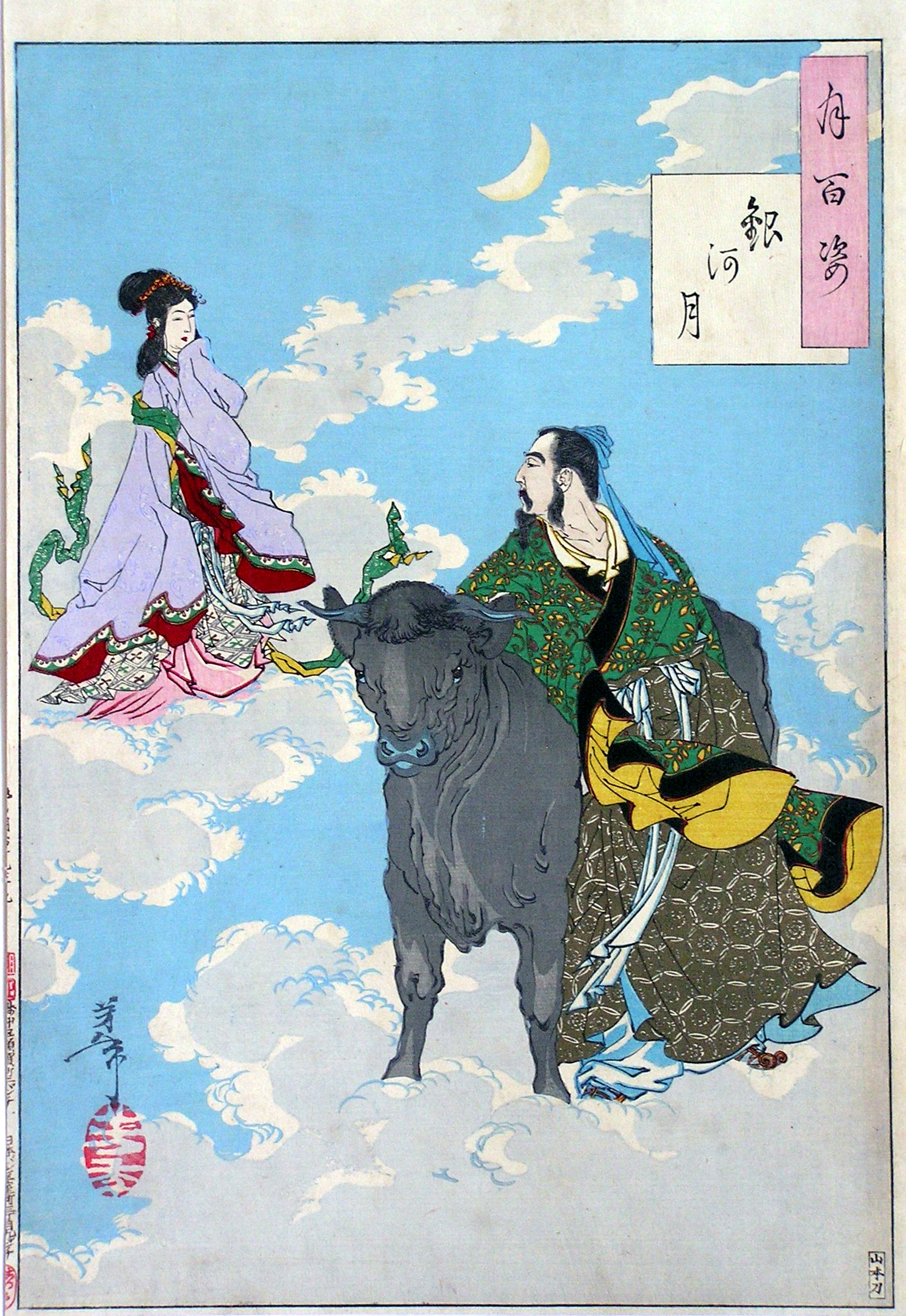
Zhinü and Niulang, by the Japanese painter Tsukioka Yoshitoshi

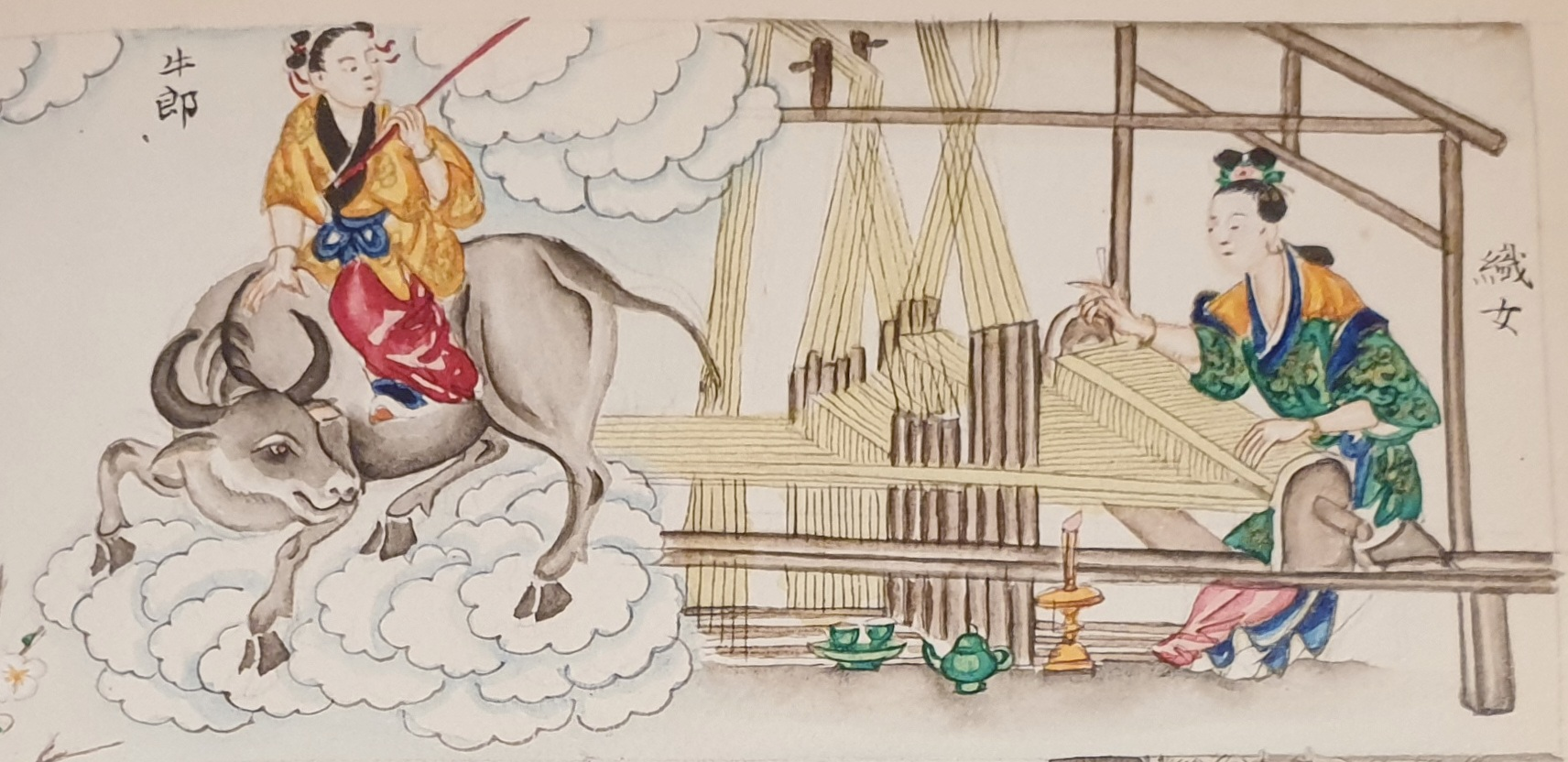
The painting of Niulang - Zhinü in the book Vân tiên cổ tích truyện of the Nguyễn dynasty by Lê Đức Trạch

One day Zhinü came down to Earth and, while bathing in a river, Niulang was passing by the river and he saw Zhinu. He was extremely happy and stole her red clothes. Without her clothes, Zhinü was unable to return to heaven. Instead, she decided to marry Niulang. Niulang farmed in the fields while Zhinü weaved at home and took care of their children - a son and a daughter. Zhinü was so deeply in love and for so long that she no longer desired a return to heaven. However, their relationship was discovered by her father, Jade Emperor, who ordered the Queen Mother of the West to bring Zhinü back to Heaven. Niulang was very upset when he found out his wife had been taken back to heaven. Niulang's ox, who saw the events unfold, built a boat for him to carry his children up to Heaven. The ox was once the god of cattle but was punished after he had violated the laws of Heaven.

Just when Niulang and his children were about to reach Heaven, the Queen Mother of the West punished them by creating the River of Heaven, or Milky Way, across the middle of the sky, separating the two lovers forever. Heartbroken, Zhinü became the star Vega and Niulang the star Altair.

Eventually, the Queen Mother of the West allowed them to meet once a year on the seventh day of the seventh month when a flock of magpies swarm into the sky and create a bridge for them to cross. The day is celebrated as the "Qixi Festival", also known as China's Valentine’s Day. Today the Chinese phrase "Niulang Zhinü" is commonly used to describe loving married couples.

The story was selected as one of China's Four Great Folktales by the "Folklore Movement" in the 1920s—the others being the Legend of the White Snake, Lady Meng Jiang, and Liang Shanbo and Zhu Yingtai.

== See also ==
- Qixi Festival
