= Gai Qi =

Chinese calligrapher and painter (1774–1829)

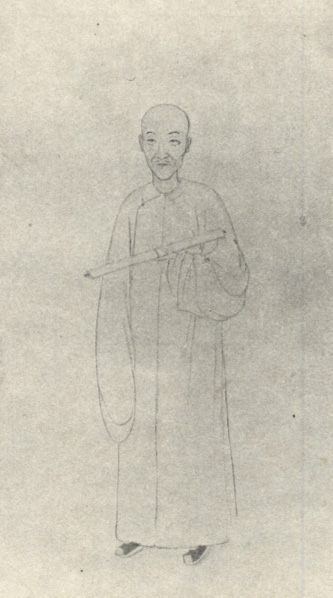
Gai Qi

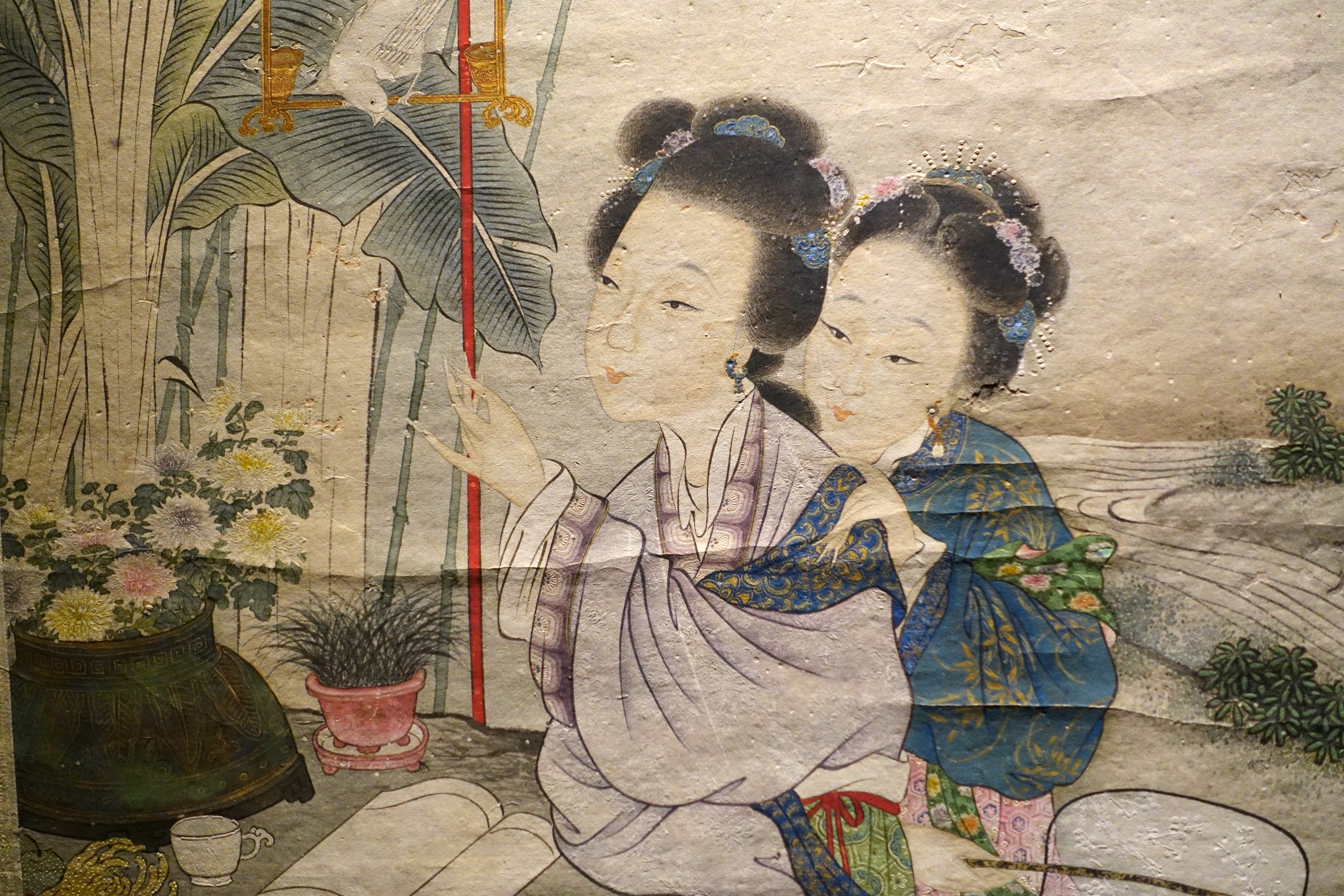
Two Beauties in a Garden, detail

Gai Qi (Chinese: 改琦; 1774–1829), courtesy name Bowen (伯蕰), art names Qiliang (七郎) and Yuhu Waishi (玉壶外史), was a poet and painter born in western China during the Qing dynasty. As an artist, he was active in Shanghai. His paintings mainly concerns plants, beauty, and figures. However, he also did numerous landscapes. In poetry, he preferred the rhyming ci form and added such poems to his paintings.

His social circle included prominent literati as well as artists. He organized both a literary society and a Buddhist lay society. His work often used a delicate baimiao (outline) style, which can be clearly seen in his illustrations for the novel, Dream of the Red Chamber. The illustrations are chiefly portraits of the main characters in the novel. Numerous poets, including the renowned woman poet Zhou Qi, wrote poems to accompany the illustrations.

The scholar Wang Qisun (王岂孙) commissioned Gai Qi to paint an album of famous Chinese women, both historical and legendary. Wang's second wife, Cao Zhenxiu, wrote poems about the women and produced the calligraphy in the album. Gai took as a student the talented woman painter and poet Qian Shoupu (錢守璞) (c. 1801–1869). He was associated with the painter Fei Danxu in what has been called the "Gai Fei" school. Gai's grandson continued the tradition of the Gai Fei school, along with the descendants of Fei Danxiu. He is perhaps best-known today for the Hongloumeng tiyong, a book of portraits of characters in the Dream of the Red Chamber, accompanied by poems about the characters.

Gai's work is held in the permanent collections of many museums worldwide, including the Metropolitan Museum of Art, the Los Angeles County Museum of Art, the Johnson Museum of Art, the Palace Museum, the British Museum, the University of Michigan Museum of Art, the Museum of Fine Arts, Boston, the Princeton University Art Museum, and the Indianapolis Museum of Art.

== Sources ==
- Chinese Paintings in the Ashmolean Museum Oxford(45) Oxford ISBN 1-85444-132-9
- China on-site
- Zhongguo lidai shinü huaji 中國歷代仕女畫集 (A collection of paintings of women through the ages) edited by Guo Xueshi 郭学是and Zhang Zikang. 张子康 (Tianjin: Tianjin renmin meishu chubanshe and Shijiazhuang: Hebei jiaoyu chubanshe, 1998).
- Hidden Meanings of Love and Death in Chinese Painting: Selections from the Marilyn and Roy Papp Collection. Edited by Chun-yi Lee. (Phoenix: Phoenix Art Museum, 2013), esp. pp. 36–42.
