= Double Seventh Festival (disambiguation) =

The Double Seventh Festival refers to the 7th day of the 7th month in the local lunisolar calendars within the East Asian cultural sphere, or Gregorian calendar for Japan. Various festivals are celebrated on this day across the region. Including:

- Qixi Festival in Greater China
- Chilseok in Korea
- Tanabata in Japan
- Thất Tịch in Vietnam
