= Tanzaku =

Strips of paper on bamboo for writing

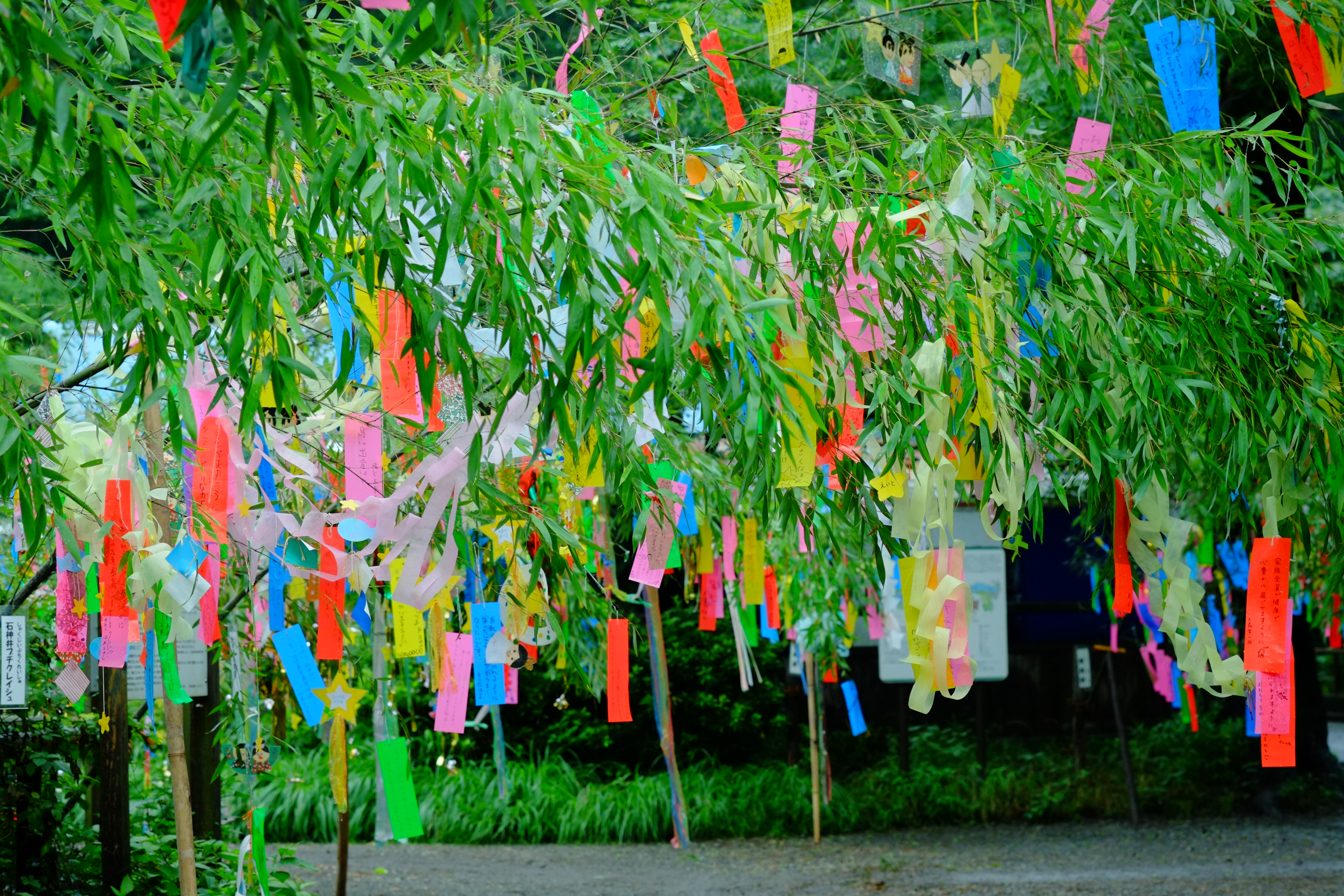
Tanzaku hanging on bamboo, photographed in 2015

Tanzaku (短冊, tanzaku; lit. 'short book') is a long, narrow strip of paper that can be used to write text or draw a simple illustration on it. It has a long history and started being called "tanzaku" during the Kamakura period. There's a specific format when writing waka on tanzaku.

In present-day Japan, tanzaku is used to celebrate Tanabata by writing wishes and hanging them on bamboo. The practice can be traced back to the Edo period, when Terakoya used tanzaku to show their student's work. During the Taisho period and the Shōwa period, schools in Japan started introducing the use of tanzaku. The practice deepened as time went on, and has become a national custom after World War II.

Tanzaku is included in Unicode as the emoji U+1F38B 🎋 TANABATA TREE.

== Etymology ==
There are various theories regarding the etymology of tanzaku. The first one comes from the practice of promoting government officials, in which those who were granted promotions were recorded on tanzaku. These tanzaku were bound with hemp cord according to official rank and then placed in a box. Another one comes from shinjutsu (賑給, 賑恤), an activity offering resources to the poor, who used tanzaku with described amount to obtain resources. At the time, tanzaku were referred to as any strip of paper, including those used for divination, waka writing, sticky notes known in modern days. It is said that the tanzaku used to write waka originated from the Cloistered rule.

== Format ==
Tanzaku in one of the emoji

Sizes of tanzaku are vary by each school, but mostly, its length is 1 shaku 1 sun 5 bu (approximately 35 cm) and the width is 1 sun 8 bu (approximately 6 cm).

No further format required when writing Haiku or poems on tanzaku, but it is required when writing waka: it should be written in two lines, with the upper phrase on the first line and the lower phrase on the second line. A rule known as mitsu-ori hanji-kakari (三つ折り半字かかり) were also required. The first character of the upper line should be positioned, and half of it extends above the line marking the upper third of the paper. Ink replenishment should occur at the first, third, and fifth phrases. The title is written above waka; titles of three characters or fewer are written on a single line, while those of four or more characters are split across two lines. More detailed rules may required depending on the author's gender, social status, or the waka's format (whether it is original or a classic work).

During the Muromachi period, tanzaku featured decorations, including cloud-shaped patterns and underdrawings. Regarding the cloud, blue or indigo was used for the upper section, while purple or brown was used for the lower. When gold or silver leaf was scattered across the design, the section with the greater expanse of open space (or the heavier concentration of leaf) was positioned at the top. In cases where the decoration appeared on only one side, the unadorned area was placed at the bottom. Originally, the milky way was the main subject of tanzaku if it was hung on Tanabata, but it simply consists of wishes in modern times.

== History ==
An illustration featuring a woman hanging tanzaku on a Sakura tree, drawn in 1897

The origin of tanzaku is eternal. The word "短籍" is described in Nihon Shoki and Shoku Nihongi. Something similar was also described in The Pillow Book. The strip of paper known at the time was not tanzaku in modern sense but a hineribumi (拈り文) instead. Hineribumi was used to write text, draw lots, or divination. Waka Shitennō (Kenkō, Jōben, Keiun, and Ton'a) during the Nanboku-chō period used plain white tanzaku without decorative patterns.

The first document mentioning the word tanzaku can be seen in the Entries for April, Shōwa 2 (1313) (正和二年四月条) in Hanazono Tennō Shinki from the late Kamakura period. At that time, tanzaku was used as a simplified form of Kaishi for prose composition and waka gatherings. There are also instances where tanzaku was used as stakes in poetry contests.

The oldest tanzaku that exists nowadays comes from Hōshakkyō Yōbon Shihai Tanzaku (宝積経要品紙背短冊) with 120 sheets in one volume in Kōei 3 (1344). The tanzaku recorded in the document share a nearly identical format, so it is generally presumed that the conventions of waka in tanzaku were established by the mid-14th century. By the Muromachi period, tanzaku began to feature decorative patterns such as cloud or doro-e.

=== Tanabata ===
Close shot of tanzaku

A bamboo tree hanging tanzaku at shōtengai in Moriguchi, Osaka, photographed in 2023

The practice of handing tanzaku with people's wishes on bamboo on Tanabata is generally believed to have originated during the Edo period. At that time, while people made their wishes on Tanabata, Terakoya, a traditional private educational institution in Edo Japan, were also popularised. Teachers in Terakoya would instruct male students to hang tanzaku on Tanabata to display their calligraphy and aspire to further improvement. The practice spread nationwide in the late Edo period.

Modern schools in Japan started celebrating Tanabata from the Taisho period and the Shōwa period. Teachers at the time suggested that Tanabata is important for emphasising childlike heart and can evoke adults' nostalgic feelings. A 1938 document recorded that kindergartens in Japan offered bamboo on Tanabata, decorated with kirigami, origami, and tanzaku.

The practice has become an important activity for schools in Japan and spread nationwide after World War II. Aside from emphasizing a childlike spirit, schools at the time could prepare bamboo and paper for Tanabata, which was more affordable and more gender-neutral than Hinamatsuri, a Girls' Day that would be difficult to implement in schools with male students. It was therefore welcomed by schools in Japan. Under the influence of modern schools in Japan, regions that had not previously celebrated Tanabata started doing so in the postwar period.

Another force promoted the practice of celebrating Tanabata was shōtengai which tried to attract customers. For example, shōtengai in Hiratsuka, the city that was destroyed after a massive bombing, sought to revitalise after the war. Although they had not previously celebrated Tanabata, they modelled Tanabata celebration in Sendai to celebrate Tanabata and attract customers. The event drew almost a million people over a week in 1955 and 3.5 million in 1971. After the success in Hiratsuka, shōtengai in Japan started celebrating Tanabata one after another by providing tanzaku and a bamboo tree.

Under the influence of schools and shōtengai in Japan, writing wishes on tanzaku and hang them on a bamboo tree has become a nationwide custom in Japan that Japanese people would experience in childhood.

== See also ==
- Qixi Festival
- Chilseok
- Kadomatsu
- Wish Tree
