= Qiyue =

Seventh month of the Chinese calendar

Qīyuè

Chinese name
- Chinese: 七月
- Hanyu Pinyin: Qīyuè
Transcriptions
Standard Mandarin
- Hanyu Pinyin: Qīyuè

Korean name
- Hangul: 칠월
- Hanja: 七月
Transcriptions
- Revised Romanization: Chirwol

Traditional Korean name
- Hangul: 원숭이달
- Hanja: 申月
Transcriptions
- Revised Romanization: Wonsungidal

Japanese name
- Kanji: 七月
- Kana: しちがつ
Transcriptions
- Romanization: Shichigatsu

Traditional Japanese name
- Kanji: 文月
- Kana: ふみづき
Transcriptions
- Romanization: Fumizuki

Qīyuè (Chinese: 七月) is the seventh month of the Chinese calendar and calendars based on it, such as the Japanese calendar, Korean calendar and Vietnamese calendar. It follows Liùyuè and precedes Bāyuè. It is known in Japanese as Shichigatsu (Japanese: 七月) or traditionally Fumizuki (Japanese: 文月), and in Korean as Chirwol (Korean: 칠월; Hanja: 七月) or traditionally Wonsungidal (Korean: 원숭이달; Hanja: 申月). All of these words can also refer to the month of July in the Gregorian calendar.

== Names ==
In Mandarin Chinese, traditional names of the month include lányuè (Chinese: 蘭月／兰月), qiǎoyuè (Chinese: 巧月), and mèngqiū (Chinese: 孟秋).

In Japanese, the month is known as shichigatsu (Japanese: 七月) or traditionally fumizuki (Japanese: 文月). Several etymologies have been proposed for fumizuki. The 12th century poet Fujiwara no Kiyosuke connected it to spreading out written texts (文; fumi) during Tanabata, and another explanation connects it with rice ears developing grain. Alternative Japanese name include mōshū (孟秋), oyazuki (親月), tanabatazuki (七夕月), ominaeshizuki (女郎花月), rangetsu (蘭月), and ryōgetsu (涼月).

== Observances ==
- The Qixi Festival is held on the 7th day of the 7th month.
- Tanabata was traditionally celebrated on the 7th day of the 7th month in Japan.
- Chilseok is celebrated on the 7th day of the 7th month in Korea.
- The Ghost Festival is held on the 15th day of the 7th month.
- Obon was traditionally celebrated on the 15th day of the 7th month.
- Yabuiri (Japanese: 藪入り) was a festival traditionally observed on the 16th day of the 1st and 7th months, on which apprentices, servants and maidservants were given gifts and allowed to return to their parents' homes for the day.

== Dates ==
Below is a list of the start and end dates of Qīyuè in the Gregorian calendar. Because the 1-hour difference between China and Japan/Korea occasionally affects the date on which a new moon occurs, the dates below can differ from those of the Japanese and Korean calendars.

Dates of Qīyuè
Year	First day	Last day
2016	3 August	31 August
2017	22 August	19 September
2018	11 August	9 September
2019	1 August	29 August
2020	19 August	16 September
2021	8 August	6 September
2022	29 July	26 August
2023	16 August	14 September
2024	4 August	2 September
2025	23 August	21 September
2026	13 August	10 September
2027	2 August	31 August
2028	20 August	18 September
2029	10 August	7 September
2030	30 July	28 August
2031	18 August	16 September
2032	6 August	4 September
2033	26 July	24 August
2034	14 August	12 September
2035	4 August	1 September
2036	22 August	19 September
