= Fumizuki (disambiguation) =

Fumizuki (Japanese: 文月; "month of erudition") is the traditional name of the month of July in the Japanese calendar. It can also refer to:

- Kou Fumizuki (文月 晃), Japanese manga artist
- Japanese destroyer Fumizuki (文月), Mutsuki-class destroyer of the Imperial Japanese Navy
