= Qixi Tribute =

- Simplified Chinese: 七夕贡案
- Traditional Chinese: 七夕貢案
- Literal meaning: "a sort of artware as offering to celebrate Qixi Festival "
Transcriptions
Standard Mandarin
- Hanyu Pinyin: qīxīgòngàn

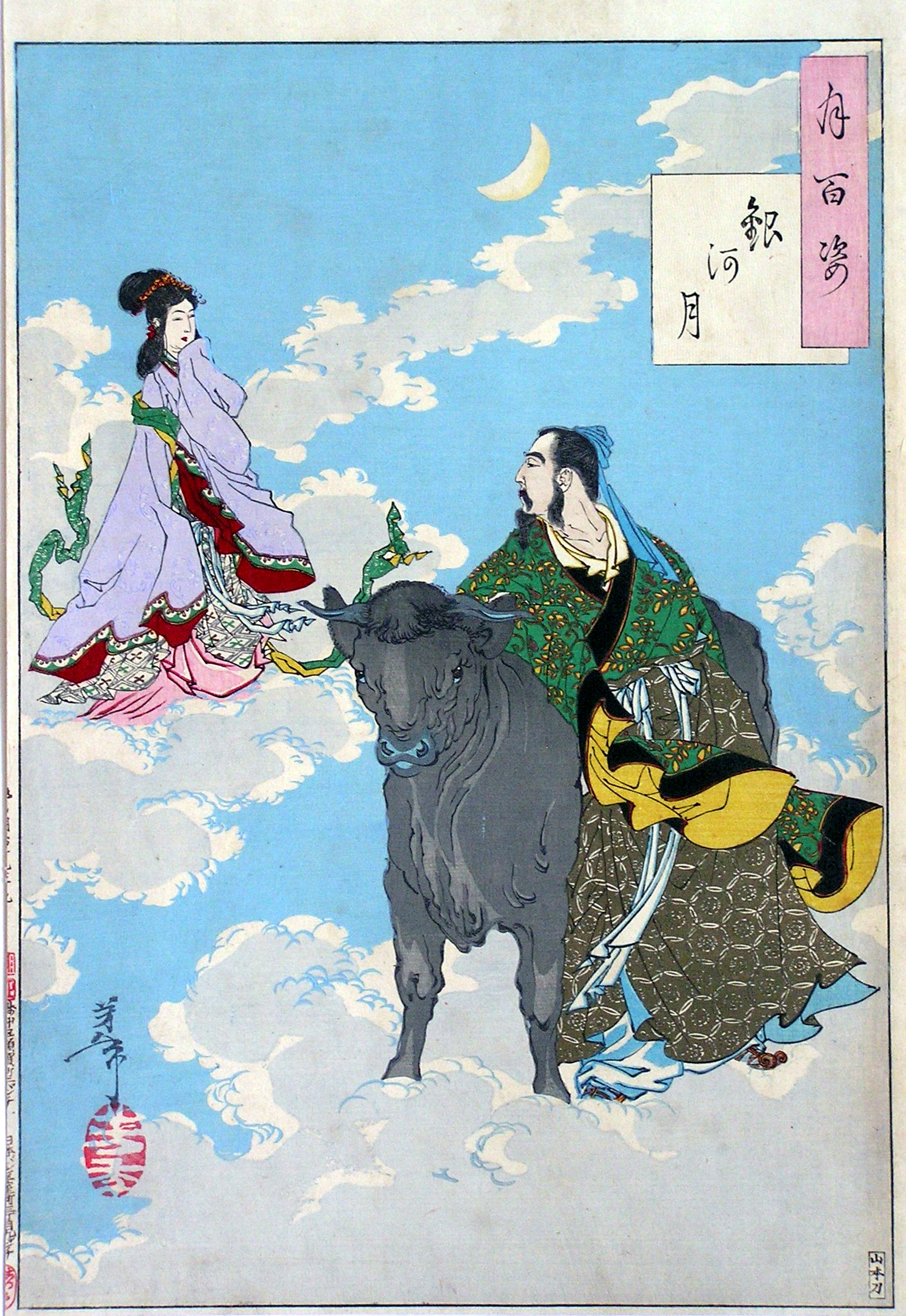
Zhinü and Niulang, by the Japanese painter Tsukioka Yoshitoshi.

Qixi Tribute (Chinese: 七夕贡案; pinyin: Qīxì gòngàn) is an important and necessary part of annual celebration during the Qixi Festival or Qiqiao Festival. Based on the mythology about The Weaver Girl and the Cowherd, a Qixi Tribute is a representation of their love meeting. It is one of the most popular customs of the Han Chinese in Dongguan, Guangdong province, especially in Wangniudun, a town in Dongguan city. Every year the government of Wangniudun holds a night-long Qixi festival celebration. Plenty of local people and tourists visit Wangniudun to share the happiness of the celebration.

== History ==
The Qixi Festival (Qiqiao Festival) is an annual event on 7th day of the 7th lunar month in the Chinese calendar, celebrating the love story of the Cowherd and the Weaver Girl. Because the Weaver girl is the youngest sister of seven fairies, she is also known as "the Seventh Sister". Young girls in China are accustomed to worship the Seventh Sister while praying for their true love. Every year, not only young girls but also boys, the elderly and children are fond of taking part in the Qixi festival. In order to show their worship to the Weaver Girl, almost every family holds a ceremony. Firstly, the family prepares tributes like melon, apples and some desserts. Young girls like to make some handicrafts of their own to show their eagerness to the Weaver Girl. Then the family places a table in the front yard under the sky aiming to show their great respect to the goddess. At the same time, the whole family shares the food and blessing together. Apart from worshiping the Weaver Girl, people are fond of showing their respect to the other six goddesses, so worshiping the Seven Goddesses has become a regular custom.

== Development ==
One of the famous customs is "the Seven Goddesses Worship", which dates back to the Five Dynasties period (AD. 907–960) in China. It is always held on the night of 6th day of the 7th lunar month in the Chinese calendar. Wangniudun has a custom of making Qixi tribute, worshiping the Seven Goddesses. This activity was once discontinued during the Cultural Revolution (1967–1977), and resumed in the early years of the reform and opening up (December, 1978–). A group of villagers organized the Qixi tribute during the Qixi Festival. Gradually, more and more villagers took part in the activity. They worked together with folk artists, assuring the forms of Qixi tribute with some crops grown locally, a river region in Dongguan. From then on, celebration of the Qixi festival, as well as Qixi tribute, has been a prosperous social activity in Wangniudun, Dongguan and even in Southern China.

== Ingredient ==
Local craftsmen in Wangniudun are skillful at creating their tributes. Their materials are accessible and environmentally-friendly. For instance, they use waste like foamed plastic, bamboo sticks, woolen yarn, parget and so on. They also use some kinds of crops as the main materials, such as cereal straw, garlic husk and so on. Craftsmen practiced in making chrysanthemums with rice, making lotus flowers with garlic husks, making wintersweet flowers with pistachio shells, making cherry blossoms with red melon seed and making lamps with eggshells. Craftsmen creatively add plastic beads, plastic sheets, colorful paper, colorful cloth and so on as materials, aiming to make exquisite Qixi tributes to help people to show their great worship to the Seven Goddesses.

== Form ==
Sculpture, embroidery, drawing and hand-making are the main forms of Qixi tribute.

== Tools ==
The following tools are used to make Qixi tributes: scissors, plane, drawknife, ruler, chisel, brush, mallet, nails, abrasive paper.

== Production Steps ==
=== Planning and Design ===
The theme of the Qixi Tribute is always relative to fairy tales and rural customs. As soon as the theme is decided, the characters, scene and story are designed.

=== Preparation of Materials ===
The materials are collected from daily life, such as some types of waste and crops. In modern times, objects such as chromatic lamps may be used in the tribute. This makes the Qixi tribute an emblem of tradition and modernization.

=== Cooperation ===
The whole table of tributes is handmade, taking the form of sculpture, embroidery, drawing and some other crafts. In order to produce a table of Qixi tribute, dozens of craftsmen have to spend several months working hard on it together.

== Process of Celebration ==
Qixi tributes usually can be divided into five parts, and each part is endowed with different blessing.

=== Preparation of Tea, White Spirits and Food ===
The first part is preparing tea, white spirits and some vegetarian food (茶酒齋飯). These are necessities in every Chinese worship ceremony, such as Spring Festival, Qingming Festival and Mid-autumn Festival. During Qixi Festival, this preparation is on behalf of the invitation to the seven goddesses to share it.

=== Dragon Dance and Lion Dance ===
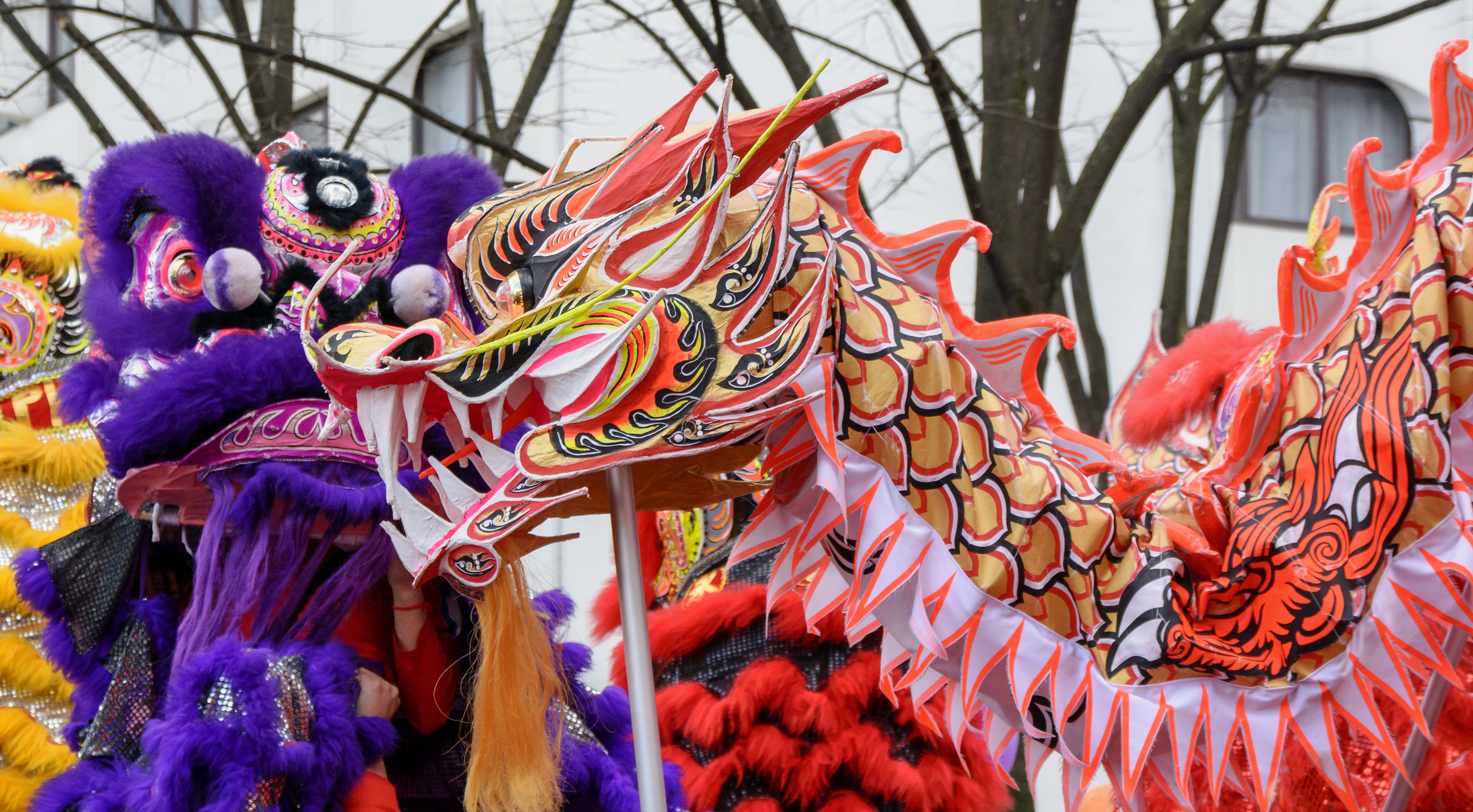
Nouvel an chinois 2015 Paris 13 danses lion dragon

The second part is the dragon dance and lion dance (龍獅賀節). Craftsmen usually model dragon, phoenix, lion, qilin and other Chinese mascots in exquisite size. These mascots are not stiff but are vivid, expressing the scene of dragon dance and lion dance. The dances also play an important role in Chinese festival celebration and are helpful to create a joyous atmosphere.

=== Produce and Harvests ===
The third part is produce and harvests (五穀豐登). Craftsmen are accustomed to display an abundant harvest of rice, red beans, green beans, corns, peanuts and other grains, which symbolize hope for a wealthy year. Meanwhile, craftsmen display seven flowers, seven fruits, seven pairs of embroidered shoes, seven sets of desks and chairs and seven garments in hand for seven goddesses. This implies the sharing mortal happiness with gods.

=== Love Story Across the Milky Way ===
The fourth part is the annual meeting of the cowherd and the weaver girl (the Seventh Sister) across the Milky Way (鵲橋相會). It represents the touching scene of the loving couple, showing the beautiful happiness and expectation to the immortal love.

=== Burning Incense and Worshiping ===
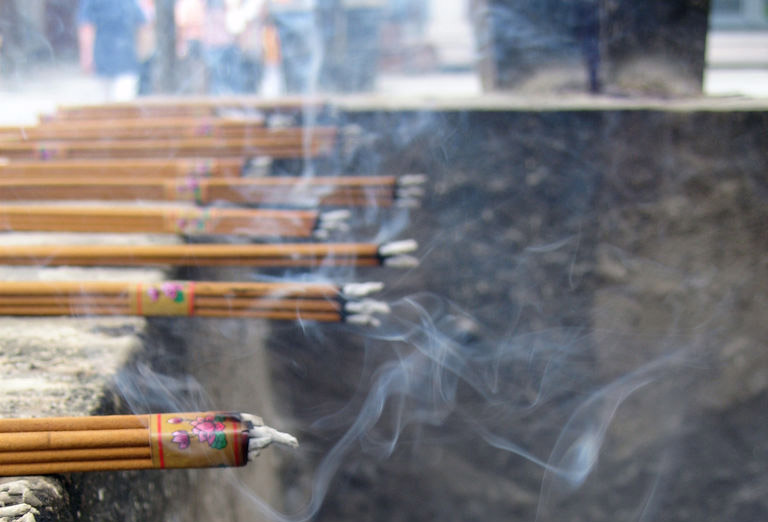
Burning incense at the Longhua Temple

The fifth part is burning incense and worshiping (拜祭香燭). With a table of well-prepared tributes, people hold the ceremony in front of the table at eleven o’clock on the night of 6th day of the 7th lunar month. It marks the start of Qixi Festival.

== Production Scale ==
There are three different production scales of Qixi tribute: family group, union of seven families, and collective cooperation.

=== Family Group ===
The first one is family group. Every family make some exquisite tributes on their own, and set a traditional big square table (八仙桌, usually dines eight persons) to place the tributes on it. According to family group, the scale is small so that the tribute is simple but varied.

=== Union of Seven Families ===
The second is a union of seven families. They have to set more than one big square table to worship the Seven Goddesses. Due to the large production scale, the tribute's forms are varied and its amount is large, which can present colorful, abundant details about the love story and mortal's lives.

=== Collective Cooperation ===
The third is collective cooperation, which is the largest production scale. The village head calls villagers together to buy a piglet. And every family takes turns to feed the piglet for several days. In the past, when the pig became bigger near the Qixi Festival, the villagers would sell the pig out to earn some money to fund the making of Qixi tributes. But nowadays, instead of being sold, the pig is killed on the eve of the Qixi Festival as an offering to the Seven Goddesses. After the ceremony, the pork will be distributed to every family in the village. A craftsman Huang Wenzheng (黃文正) said that nothing is more valuable than sharing the happiness together. Being the largest scale of Qixi tributes, collective cooperation makes people work together, which is beneficial to creating colorful, creative and abundant tributes.

== Regional Celebration ==
Although worshiping the Seventh Sister is an accustomed activity, the practice differs between places.

=== Guangzhou ===
In Guangzhou, before the Qixi Festival, young unmarried girls make different kinds of flowers, fruits, ladies, implements, palaces and other festival objects using colored paper, sesame seeds and rice flour. Meanwhile, the girls also grow green beans to about two inches tall. This is called worshiping the immortal plant (拜仙菜). After setting the tributes, the girls burn incense and light up the oil lamp in the middle of the immortal plant, bowing down toward the sky. This is called Welcoming the Goddess (迎仙).

=== Dongguan ===
==== Wangniudun ====
The Qixi Festival Celebration has been held every Qixi Festival, which becomes part of the brand of Wangniudun (望牛墩). Plenty of activities appeal to the thousands of local people and tourists who take part in the celebration. In 2016, the Qixi Festival Celebration was held on August 8 to 10 in Wangniudun. It covers three main activities within nine items.

1. Romantic Meeting on Qixi Festival (1) Romantic encounter—let tourists leave their memories of love on the photo gallery. (2) Blessing with Lotus Lamp—Lotus lamp is a traditional custom in the region of rivers, and let tourists place their blessings with lotus lamp and set free on the river. (3) 3D Technology—make some bread or pancakes with romantic patterns for tourists to taste.

2. Folk Custom Exhibition (1) Cultural Tribute Exhibition—21 villages in Wangniudun make their own special Qixi tributes to compete with each other. And their tributes are placed in the square for tourists to enjoy. (2) Blessing Night—Worshiping the Seven Goddesses is performed in the way of artistic folk show. (3) Folk Custom Exhibition about The Region of Rivers—In the local museum, Qixi festival culture, Dragon-Boat culture, Farming Culture in region of rivers are displaced.

3. Happiness Share (1) Happiness Photo Collection—collect the photo of couple, family and others with the topic of love in the society. (2) Story Writing Contest—On the based on the love story of the cowherd and the weaver girl, everyone can create a new modern love story. (3) Love Concert—local bands and singers are invited to the celebration to perform the love songs.

==== Zhongtang ====
In Guozhou village (郭洲村), some women make flowers by hand with iron wire.

==== Chashan ====
People are fond of buying a decorated flower basket to worship the Seven Goddesses. The flowers are lilies, roses and five other different kinds of flowers.

==== Wanjiang Subdistrict ====
Apart from women worshiping the Seven Goddesses, men can also worship the cowherd wishing to find their true love.

== Achievements ==
In 2012, the tenth Chinese Folk Literature and Art Pediment Award was held in Haikou, Hainan Province. The Qixi tribute “the destiny of mortal and immortal” made by Wangniudun's craftsmen got the Folk Craft Art Award.

Wangniudun is famous for its Qixi tribute and the atmosphere of the Qixi Festival. So Wangniudun was given the title of “the Home of Qiqiao Folk Art in Guangdong Province”, “the home of Qiqiao Art in China”, and the Qiqiao Festival was listed into the Second batch of the Intangible Culture Heritage Protection Project in Guangdong Province. Wangniudun's Qixi tributes are collected by Guangdong Museum, Dongguan Exhibition Center and other museums.

At the same time, Wangniudun works hard to develop its famous brand of Qixi Tribute to organize various activities for society, such as Qixi festival celebration, Qixi Culture Park and so on. The town also build websites and online games, and makes films about the Qixi Festival.
