= Tanabata =

Japanese festival

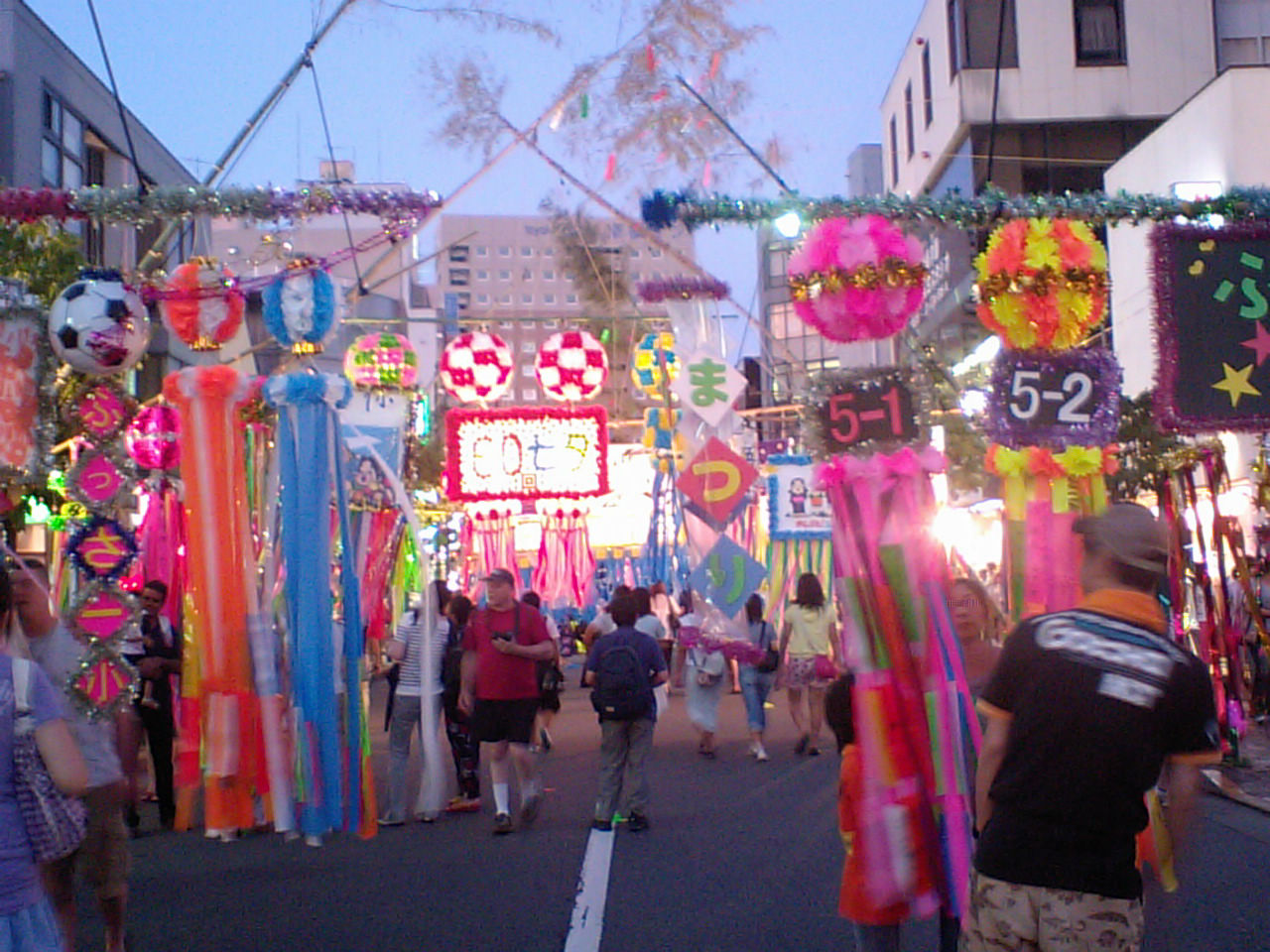
- Celebration in Tokyo, 2010
- Significance: Celebrates the meeting of the deities Orihime and Hikoboshi
- Date: 7th day of the 7th lunar month
- 2025 date: 29 August 2025
- 2026 date: 19 August 2026
- 2027 date: 8 August 2027

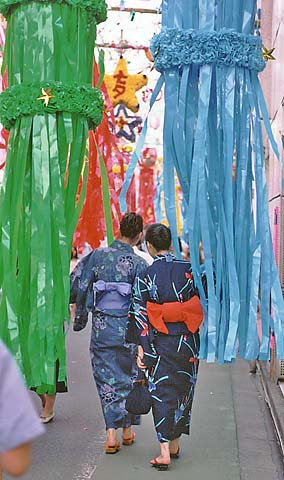
Women dressed in yukata at Tanabata

Tanabata festivities in Hiratsuka, Kanagawa in 2023

Tanabata (Japanese: たなばた or 七夕; meaning "Evening of the Seventh"), also known as the Star Festival (星祭り, Hoshimatsuri), is a Japanese festival originating from the Chinese Qixi Festival. (Note: "The Tanabata Festival is the Japanese version of the Chinese festival of the cowherd and the weaving girl, celebrated on the 7th of July.") (Note: "The Chinese legend, so popular in Japan, of the Heavenly Spouses, the Cow-Herd and the Weaver Maiden (who weaves the clouds) ...".) It celebrates the meeting of the deities Orihime and Hikoboshi (represented by the stars Vega and Altair respectively). According to legend, the Milky Way separates these lovers, and they are allowed to meet only once a year on the seventh day of the seventh lunar month of the lunisolar calendar. The date of Tanabata varies by region of the country, but the first festivities begin on 7 July of the Gregorian calendar. The celebration is held at various days between July and August.

== History ==
The festival was introduced to Japan by the Empress Kōken in 755. It originated from "The Festival to Plead for Skills" (乞巧奠, Kikkōden), an alternative name for Qixi which is celebrated in China and also was adopted in the Kyoto Imperial Palace from the Heian period.

The festival gained widespread popularity amongst the general public by the early Edo period, when it became mixed with various Obon or Bon traditions (because Bon was held on 15th of the seventh month then), and developed into the modern Tanabata festival. Popular customs relating to the festival varied by region of the country, but generally, girls wished for better sewing and craftsmanship, and boys wished for better handwriting by writing wishes on strips of paper. At this time, the custom was to use dew left on taro leaves to create the ink used to write wishes. Incidentally, Bon is now held on 15 August on the solar calendar, close to its original date on the lunar calendar, making Tanabata and Bon separate events.

The name Tanabata is remotely related to the Japanese reading of the Chinese characters 七夕, which used to be read as "Shichiseki" (see explanation about the various ways of reading kanji). It is believed that a Shinto purification ceremony existed around the same time, in which a Shinto miko wove a special cloth on a loom called a tanabata (棚機) and offered it to a god to pray for protection of rice crops from rain or storm and for good harvest later in autumn. Gradually this ceremony merged with Kikkōden to become Tanabata. The Chinese characters 七夕 and the Japanese reading Tanabata joined to mean the same festival, although originally they were two different things, an example of jukujikun. During the Heian period, the imperial court developed the custom of skewering various mountain and sea fruits, including pears, peaches, and dried sea bream, on seven gold and seven silver needles, threaded together with five-colored string (blue, yellow, red, white, and black), as an offering for Tanabata. This was accompanied by a banquet during which the emperor would observe the meeting of the stars, with performances of poetry, song, and instrumental music.

== Story ==
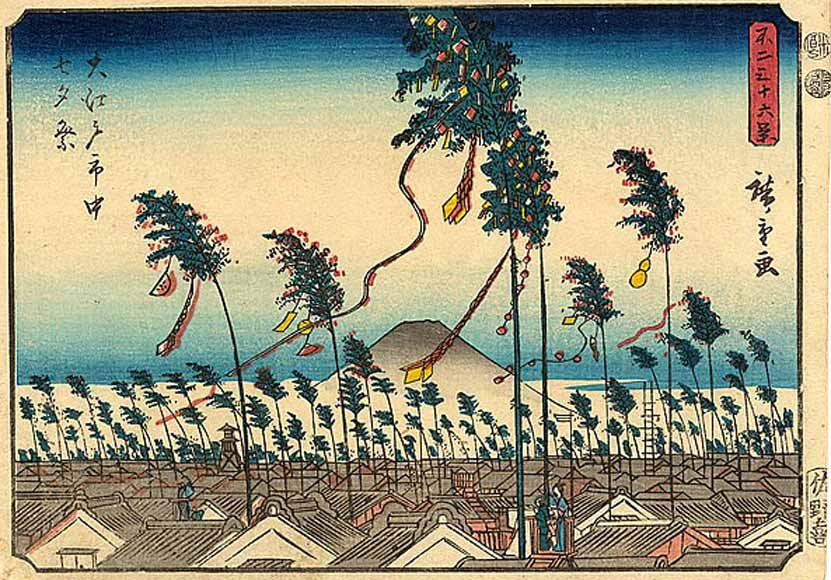
Japanese woodblock print of Tanabata festivities in Edo (Tokyo), 1852, by Hiroshige

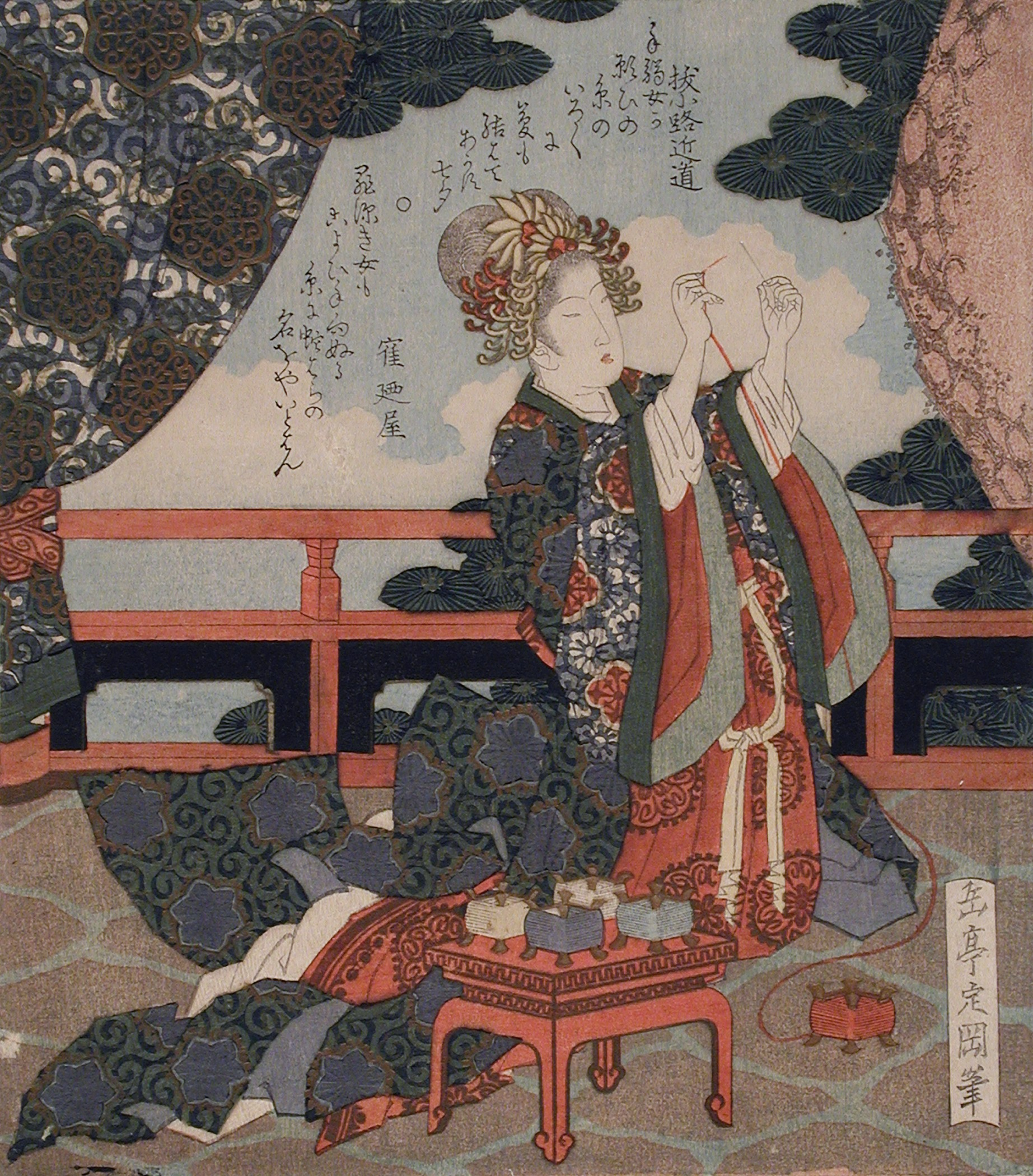
Yashima Gakutei

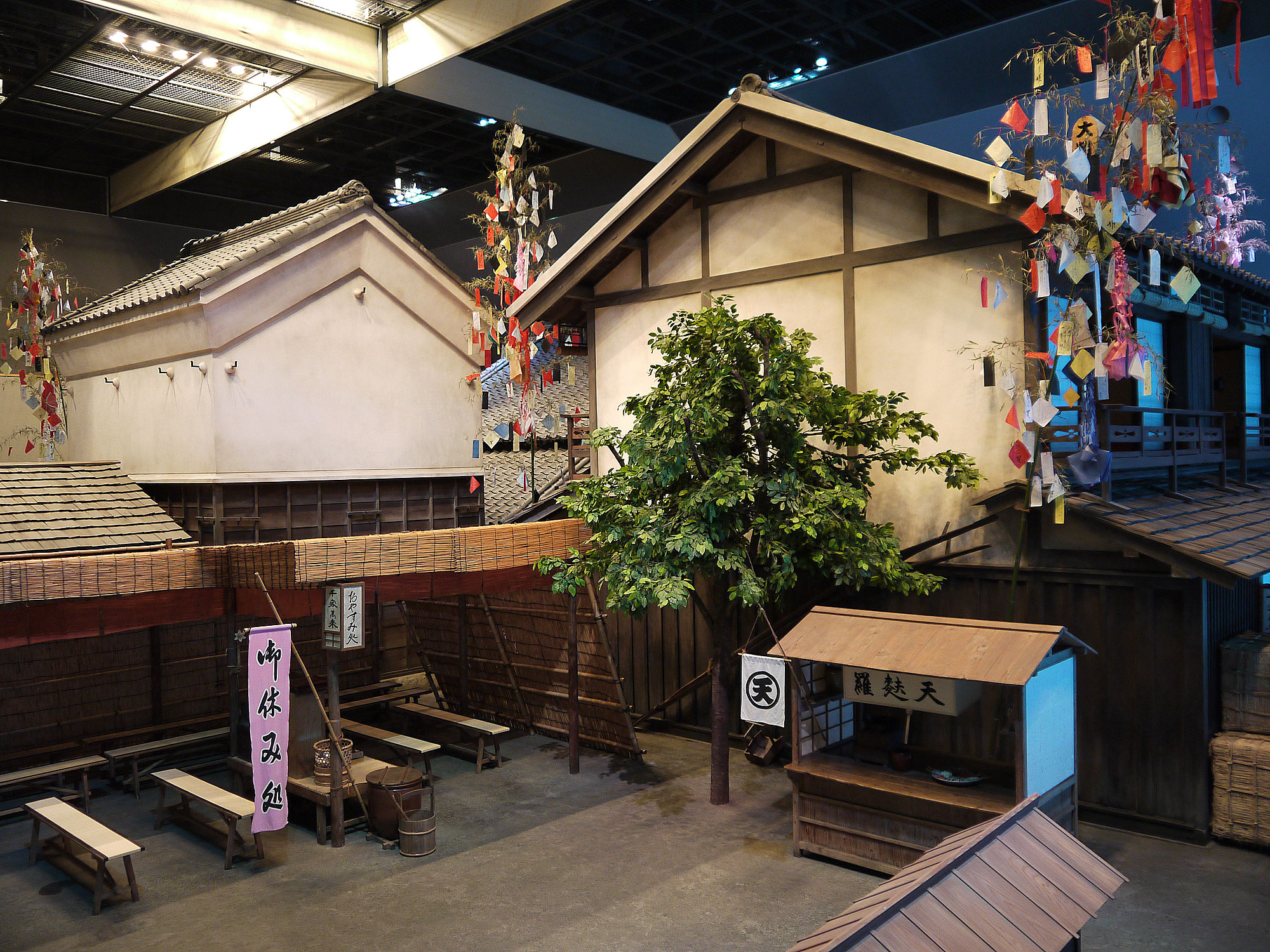
Display of Edo Tanabata at Fukagawa Edo Museum

Like Qixi and Chilseok, Tanabata was inspired by the famous Chinese folklore story, "The Cowherd and the Weaver Girl". Some versions were included in the Man'yōshū.

The most popular version is as follows:

Orihime (織姫; "Weaving Princess"), daughter of the Tentei (天帝; "Sky King", or the universe itself), wove beautiful clothes by the bank of the Amanogawa (天の川; "Milky Way", literally "heavenly river"). Her father loved the cloth that she wove and so she worked very hard every day to weave it. However, Orihime was sad that because of her hard work she could never meet and fall in love with anyone. Concerned about his daughter, Tentei arranged for her to meet Hikoboshi (彦星; "Cowman"/"Cowherd Star", or literally "Boy Star")(also referred to as Kengyū (牽牛)) who lived and worked on the other side of the Amanogawa. When the two met, they fell instantly in love with each other and married shortly thereafter. However, once married, Orihime would no longer weave cloth for Tentei and Hikoboshi allowed his cows to stray all over Heaven. In anger, Tentei separated the two lovers across the Amanogawa and forbade them to meet. Orihime became despondent at the loss of her husband and asked her father to let them meet again. Tentei was moved by his daughter's tears and allowed the two to meet on the 7th day of the 7th month if she worked hard and finished her weaving. The first time they tried to meet, however, they found that they could not cross the river because there was no bridge. Orihime cried so much that a flock of magpies came and promised to make a bridge with their wings so that she could cross the river. It is said that if it rains on Tanabata, the magpies cannot come because of the rise of the river and the two lovers must wait until another year to meet. The rain of this day is called "The tears of Orihime and Hikoboshi".

=== Names ===
==== Characters ====
Orihime and Hikoboshi are called various names in the different versions of the story.

	Orihime 織姫	Hikoboshi 彦星
Birth name	棚機津女 or 棚機つ女 - Tanabata-tsume	牽牛 – Kengyū ("Cowherd")
Title	女七夕 – Me-Tanabata ("Female Tanabata")	男七夕 – O-Tanabata ("Male Tanabata")
Various names and epithets	秋去姫 – Akisari-hime ("Going to Autumn Princess") 朝顔姫 – Asagao-hime ("Morning Glory Princess") 糸織り姫 or 糸織姫 – Ito-ori-hime ("Thread-Weaving Princess") 百子姫 – Momoko-hime ("Peach-Child Princess") 薫物姫 – Takimono-hime ("Incense Princess") 蜘蛛姫 – Sasagani-hime ("Spider Princess") 梶葉姫 – Kajinoba-hime ("Paper Mulberry Princess"), the washi paper made from the paper mulberry 琴寄姫 – Kotoyori-hime ("String Musical Instrument Gathering Princess") 灯姫 – Tomoshibi-hime ("Luminous Bright Light Princess") 妻星 – Tsuma-boshi ("Wife Constellation/ Star") 機織姫 – Hata'ori-hime ("Weaving Princess") 星の妻 – Hoshi-no-tsuma ("Constellation/ Star Wife", i.e.: wife of Kengyū)	飼星 – Kai-boshi ("Herder/ Shepherdman Star") 犬飼星 – Inukai-boshi ("Dog Herder/ Shepherdman Star") 牛引星 – Ushihiki-boshi ("Cow-tender Star")
Constellation title	女星 – Me-boshi ("Female Constellation/ Star")	男星 – O-boshi ("Male Constellation/ Star")

==== Festival ====
The Festival of Tanabata is also known by various names:

Name	Transliteration	Meaning
秋七日	Aki-nanoka	"Seventh day of Autumn"
芋の葉の露	Imo-no-ha-no-tsuyu	"Dew from the leaves of the Yams or Potatoes"
七夕雨	Tanabata-ame	"Rain of the Tanabata"
七夕送り	Tanabata-okuri	"Embarking Tanabata"
七夕紙	Tanabata-gami	"Paper of the Tanabata", i.e. paper which carries the wishes
七夕色紙	Tanabata-shikishi	"Colored paper of the Tanabata"
七夕竹	Tanabata-take	"Bamboo of the Tanabata", i.e. the bamboo that carries the decorations or wishes
七夕竹売	Tanabata-take'uri	"Bamboo of the Tanabata which offers and carries"
七夕棚	Tanabata-dana	"Rack of the Tanabata"
短冊竹	Tanzaku-dake	"Bamboo of the Tanzaku"
星今宵	Hoshi-koyoi	"Evening of the Star"
星宮祭	Hoshi-no-miya-matsuri	"Festival/ Celebration of the Star Palace" – i.e. the twin star Altair and Vega
星祭	Hoshi-matsuri	"Star Festival"

=== Other stories ===
==== Human male and Heavenly female ====
Japanese scholars have pointed out that some tales of the Tanabata cross over with the character of the Celestial Maiden (otherwise known in Japan as Tennin Nyoobo or Hagoromo).

Comparative scholarship on the Japanese variants points that at the beginning of the story, the human male goes near a lake for a variety of reasons (a prayer to the gods for a wife; a vision sent in a dream; a grateful animal points him the way). Over the course of the story, the human partner reaches the celestial realm where his wife and her family live. Once there, he is forced to perform tasks before they reunite. At the end of the narrative, the husband breaks a taboo (he should not eat a certain melon/gourd, but he does and is washed away) and he and his celestial wife are separated, only to reunite again during the night of 7 July.

James Danandjaja relates the Japanese tale of Amafuri Otome ("The Woman who came from the Sky"), as a similar tale of the unmarried mortal man, named Mikeran, who withholds the kimono from a bathing lady so she cannot fly home to the sky. Years after they marry, she finds her kimono and flies home with their children. Mikeran fashions a thousand straw sandals to reach the sky world and find his wife. When he meets his parents-in-law, the father-in-law forces him to perform some tasks, and tricks the human with cutting a thousand watermelons in one day. The human's sky wife knows it is a trap, but he does it anyway and is washed away by a flood created from the watermelons. Thus, they can only meet on the night of the Tanabata festival.

==== Human female and Heavenly male ====
Professors Masako Satō and Noriko T. Reider provided a narrative analysis of an ancient tale involving a human female and her future consort, Prince Ame-waka-hiko. In this tale of the Otogi-zōshi genre, the Prince takes the form of a serpent and marries a human woman. He later reveals he is a heavenly deity named Dragon Prince. After some time, he disappears and his human bride must seek him out (akin to the Graeco-Roman myth of Cupid and Psyche), even reaching the heavenly realm, where his father, an oni, lives. At the end of this tale, the lovers are forcibly separated by the oni father and can only reunite during the Tanabata.

Noriko T. Reider draws attention to a second story of this combination: the "Qian Luwei Tale". In this version, the human wife's father is identified as Qian Luwei, and the male deity is Hikoboshi, the son of "Bontennō", Brahma. In this second tale, titled 乾陸魏長者, in the land of Tang, the rich man named Kanroku-gi lives with his three daughters. One day, a washing maid is washing clothes when a serpent in a palanquin brings her a letter to be delivered to the choja: he demands a bride from his daughters, lest he kills his family, and requests the building of a dwelling in the mountains. The rich man is in despair, so his youngest daughter sees his desperation and agrees to marry the serpent. She brings a statue of goddess Kannon for protection and a sutra, boards up the palanquin and goes to meet the serpent in his new dwelling. She waits alone, recites the sutra, when the serpent appears to her. The serpent asks the girl to take a balse and slit his skin from neck to tail. She does so, and a handsome youth comes out of the snakeskin. They marry. Fourteen days later, Kanroku-gi sends his daughter a letter asking about her life, and she responds with a positive letter. The rich man and his elder daughters pay her a visit, and see her live in luxury, splendor and happiness. The elder sisters begin to feel envy towards their cadette. Back to the couple, the handsome youth tells his wife he is called Hikoboshi, son of the King of Heaven, Brahma (Bonten-ō), who has come down from the Heavens to marry her, but now, three years later, he must return to his celestial home. However, he promises to be back next March, and she must protect the contents of a vermilion chest, then gives her the keys to it. In his absence, her family visits her again to cheer her up, and the elder sisters fume at the treasures kept in their cadette's palace, and order her to give them the key to open the vermilion chest. The girl refuses, but she is overpowered by her sisters, who take the key and open the chest: only a wisp of smoke appears. The girl waits for her husband, but due to breaking the prohibition, time passes and he does not return. Mourning for her missing husband, a pair of magpies which she raises fly from the Heavens and carry her to the Heavenly abode. She reaches the realm of the Four Heavenly Kings, takes directions from the celestial beings and arrives at Hikoboshi's celestial palace. The couple reunites. Hikoboshi explains that he had to stay in Heaven for another three years, since a being took notice of the wisp of smoke. He also cautions her that she cannot stay in Heaven with him, so he is to ask his father to let her stay with him. Brahma gets news of his human daughter-in-law's presence in the celestial realm, but sets a task: the girl must weave a celestial robe (hagoromo) and his son must herd a thousand head of cattle, if they are to remain together in Heaven. The girl sews the robe, and becomes known as Weaving Maiden (Shokujo) and Hikoboshi as Ox-Herder (Kengyû). Conceding defeat, the King of Heaven allows for their meeting, but only once a month, then throws a melon to create the Milky Way. The girl and Hikoboshi mishear the decree as "once a year", and are only allowed to meet during the Tanabata.

In a Japanese tale sourced to Kagoshima and translated to French with the title Le serpent du ciel ("The Serpent of the Sky"), an old woman is washing the clothes in the river, when a serpent appears in the river and gives her a letter, with a request to marry the woman's lord's daughter. The woman is stunned at what to do, when the serpent threatens to devour her. The washerwoman returns with the letter to the lord, who receives the news with fright. He asks his daughters (whose names the story says it does not know) if they consent to marry the serpent: the elder daughter vehemently refuses to do so. He then turns to the youngest daughter, who is more intelligent and more devoted to her parents; the cadette agrees, if it is her father's wish. The man agrees with her decision and places her next to the river. The serpent appears to her and asks her to use some scissors to cut apart the serpent's skin. The girl does so, and out of the serpent skin comes a handsome youth. They live in happiness. One day, the youth tells the girl he has to return to the Heavens for some reason, and gives her a box which she must not open, lest he does not return to Earth. Some fifteen days after he leaves, the elder sister pays a visit to her sister and finds the box. The serpent's wife warns her against opening it, but the elder sister does so; a plume of smoke comes out of the box. The serpent's wife waits for her husband's return after the opening of the box, to no avail. She then decides to search for him in the Heavens. Up in the Heavens, she does not locate her husband at first, and has unsavory encounters with demons and every sort of beings. At last, she reunites with her husband on the edge of the Milky Way, and they spend their days in great happiness. Thus, the day of their reunion is July 7th.

== Customs ==
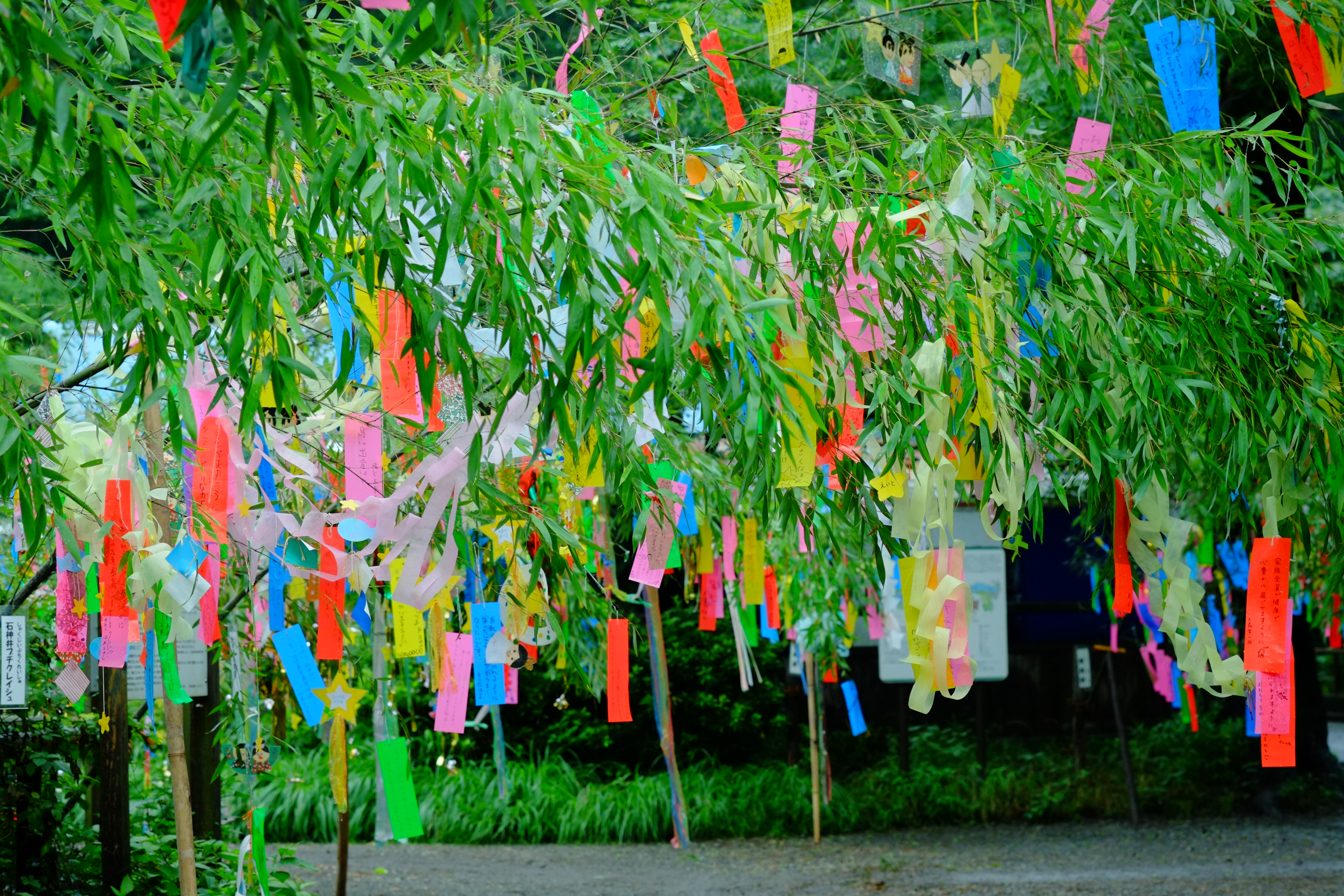
Tanzaku hanging on bamboo

In present-day Japan, people generally celebrate this day by writing wishes, sometimes in the form of poetry, on tanzaku (短冊, tanzaku), small pieces of paper, and hanging them on bamboo. This is analogous to the custom of floating paper ships and candles on rivers during Obon. Many areas in Japan have their own Tanabata customs, which are mostly related to local Obon traditions. There is also a traditional Tanabata song:

Simple

ささのは さらさら
のきばに ゆれる
お星さま きらきら
きんぎん すなご
ごしきの たんざく
わたしが かいた
お星さま きらきら
空から 見てる

Poetic

笹の葉 さらさら
軒端に 揺れる
お星様 きらきら
金銀 砂子
五色の 短冊
私が 書いた
お星様 きらきら
空から 見てる

Transliteration

Sasa no ha sara-sara
Nokiba ni yureru
Ohoshi-sama kira-kira
Kingin sunago
Goshiki no tanzaku
watashi ga kaita
Ohoshi-sama kirakira
sora kara miteru

Translation

The bamboo leaves rustle,
And sway under the eaves.
The stars twinkle
Like gold and silver grains of sand.
The five-color paper strips
I have written them.
The stars twinkle,
Watching from above.

== Date ==
The original Tanabata date was based on the Japanese lunisolar calendar, which is about a month behind the Gregorian calendar. As a result, some festivals are held on 7 July, some are held on a few days around 7 August (according to the "One-Month Delay" way), while the others are still held on the seventh day of the seventh lunar month of the traditional Japanese lunisolar calendar, which is usually in August in the Gregorian Calendar.

The Gregorian dates of "the seventh day of the seventh lunar month of the Japanese lunisolar calendar" for the coming years are:

- 2018: August 17
- 2019: August 7
- 2020: August 25
- 2021: August 14
- 2022: August 4
- 2023: August 22
- 2024: August 10
- 2025: August 29
- 2026: August 19
- 2027: August 8
- 2028: August 26
- 2029: August 16

== Festivals ==
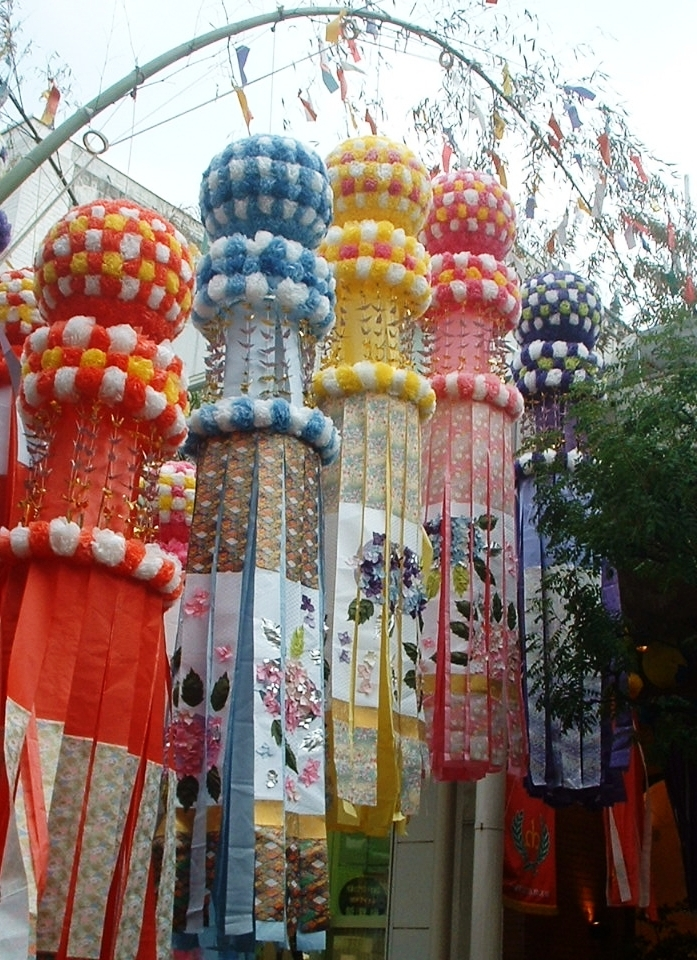
The Sendai Tanabata Festival in 2005

Large-scale Tanabata festivals are held in many places in Japan, mainly along shopping malls and streets, which are decorated with large, colorful streamers. The most famous Tanabata festival is held in Sendai from 6 to 8 August. In the Kantō area, two of the largest Tanabata festivals are held in Hiratsuka, Kanagawa (around 7 July) and in Asagaya, Tokyo immediately prior to the start of the Obon holiday in mid August. A Tanabata festival is also held in São Paulo, Brazil around the first weekend of July and Los Angeles, California in the beginning of August.

Although Tanabata festivals vary by region, most festivals involve Tanabata decoration competitions. Other events may include parades and Miss Tanabata contests. Like other Japanese matsuri, many outdoor stalls sell food, provide carnival games, etc., and add to the festive atmosphere.

Tokyo Disneyland and Tokyo DisneySea often celebrates the Tanabata Festival featuring a greeting parade with Minnie Mouse as Orihime and Mickey Mouse as Hikoboshi.

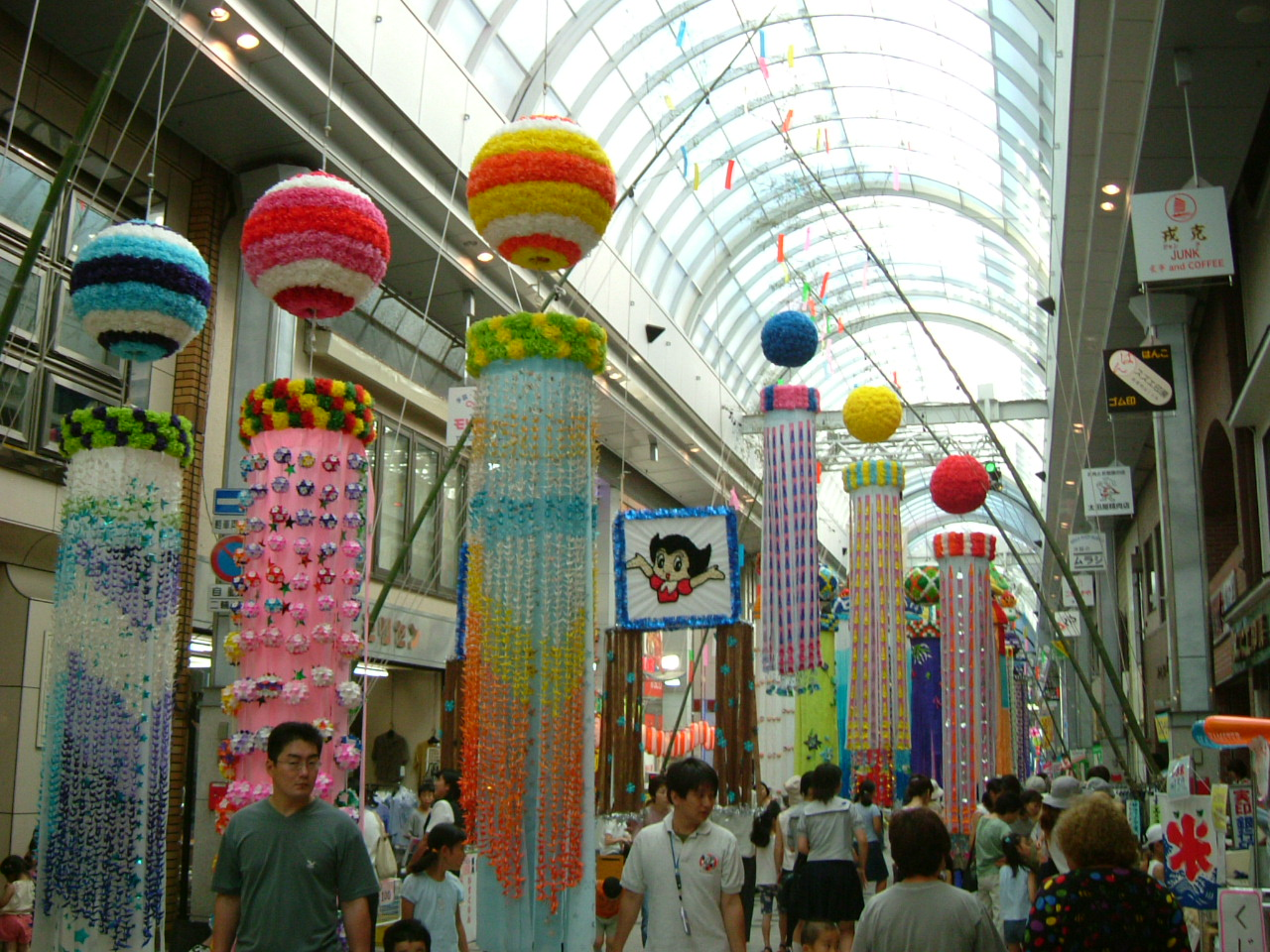
In a shopping mall at Morioka, 2003

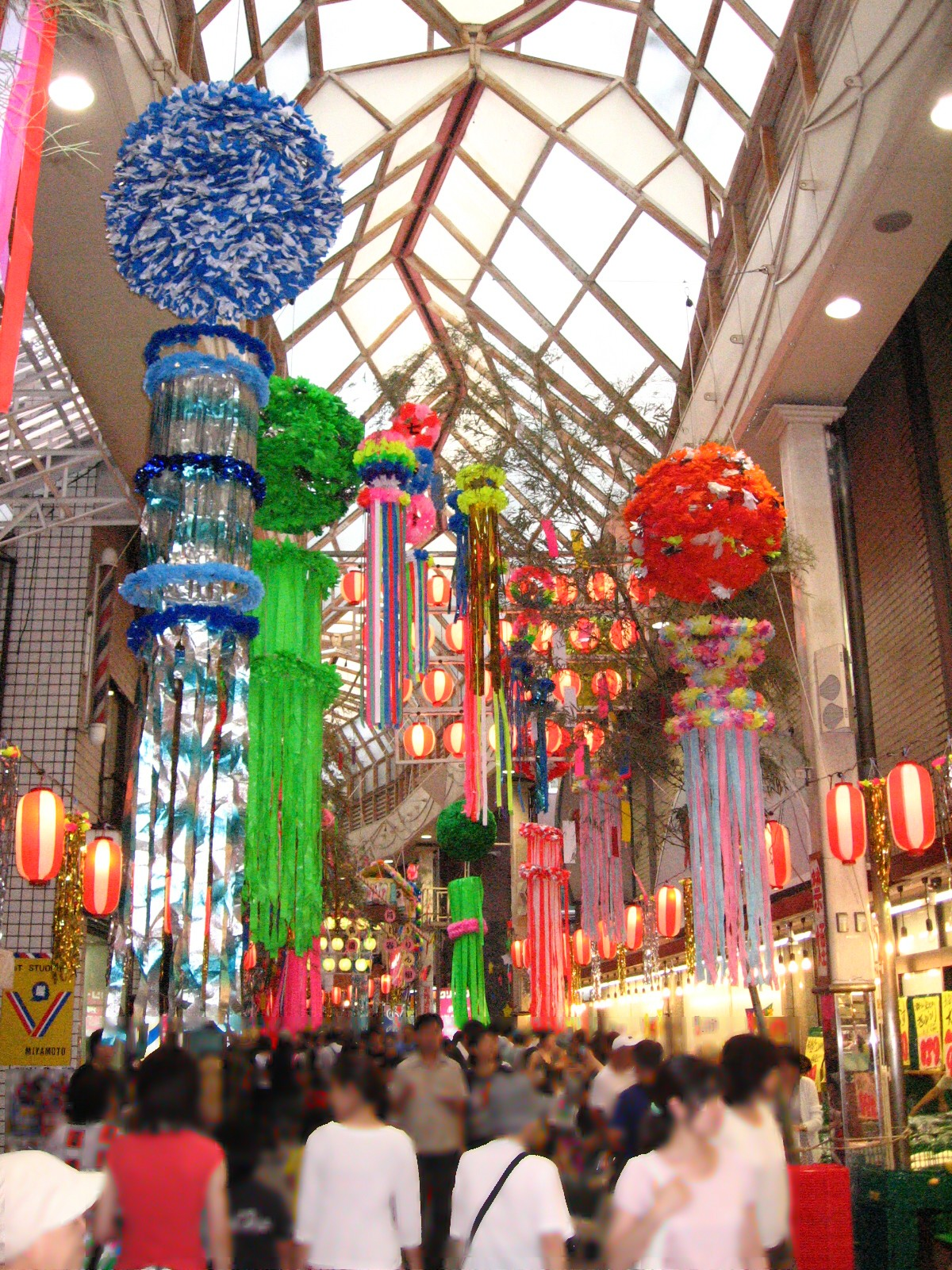
Asagaya, Suginami Ward in Tokyo, 2009

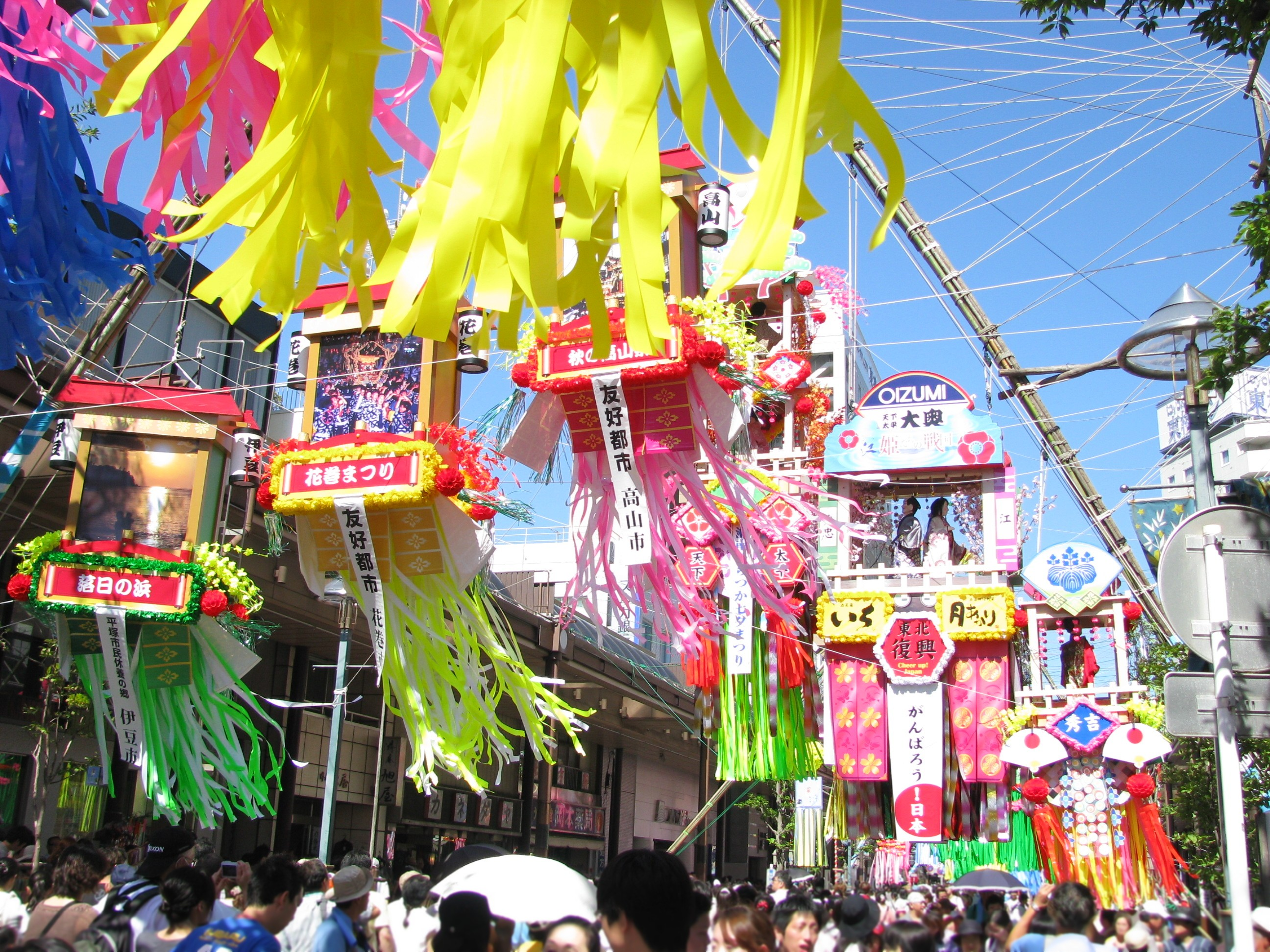
Hiratsuka, 2011

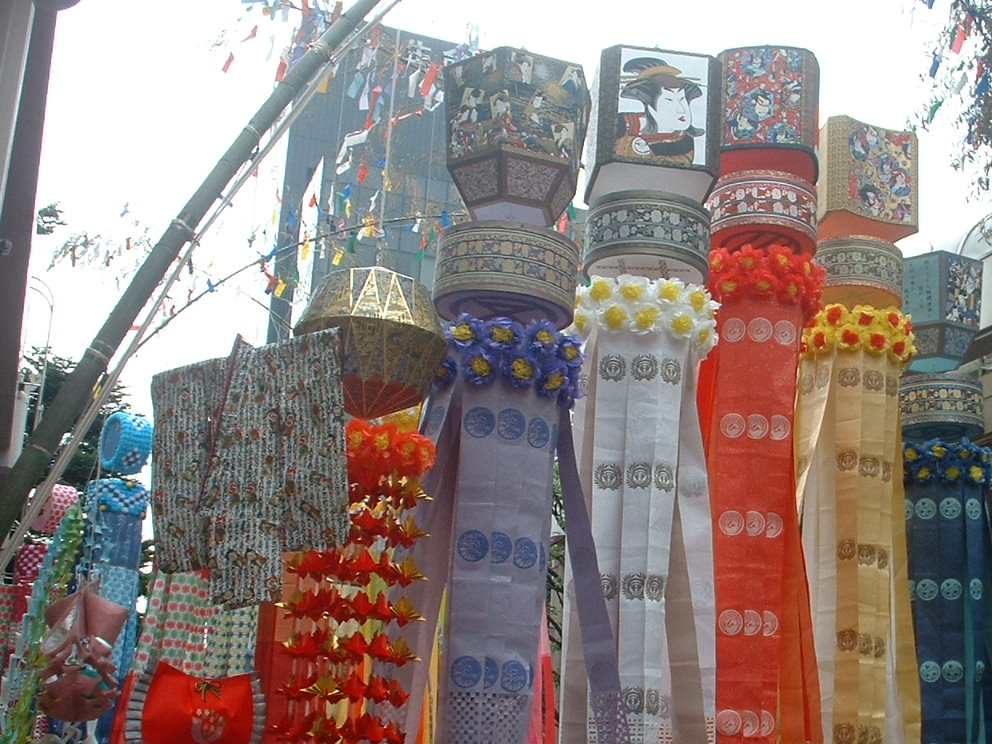
Sendai, 2005

== Sendai festival ==
The Sendai Tanabata Festival is the most famous in Japan. Tanabata has been celebrated in the region since the time of Date Masamune (1567–1636) who was the first warlord in the Sendai area. The festival began shortly after the city was founded in the early Edo Period. The Tanabata festival gradually developed and became larger over the years. Although the festival's popularity started to dwindle after the Meiji Restoration, and almost disappeared during the economic depression that occurred after World War I, volunteers in Sendai revived the festival in 1928 and established the tradition of holding the festival from 6 to 8 August.

During World War II it was impossible to hold the festival, and almost no decorations were seen in the city from 1943 to 1945, but after the war, the first major Tanabata festival in Sendai was held in 1946, and featured 52 decorations. In 1947, the Showa Emperor Hirohito visited Sendai and was greeted by 5,000 Tanabata decorations. The festival subsequently developed into one of the three major summer festivals in the Tōhoku region and has become a major tourist attraction. The festival now includes a fireworks show that is held on 5 August.

At the Sendai Tanabata Festival, people traditionally use seven different kinds of decorations, which each represent different meanings. The seven decorations and their symbolic meanings are:

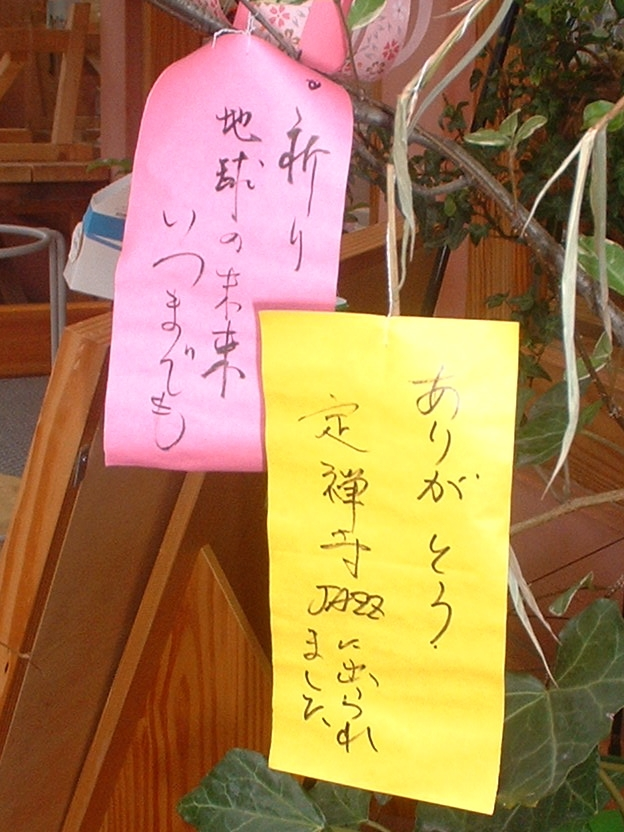
Paper strips (短冊, Tanzaku): Handwritten wishes for a good future to the earth and a thanks note

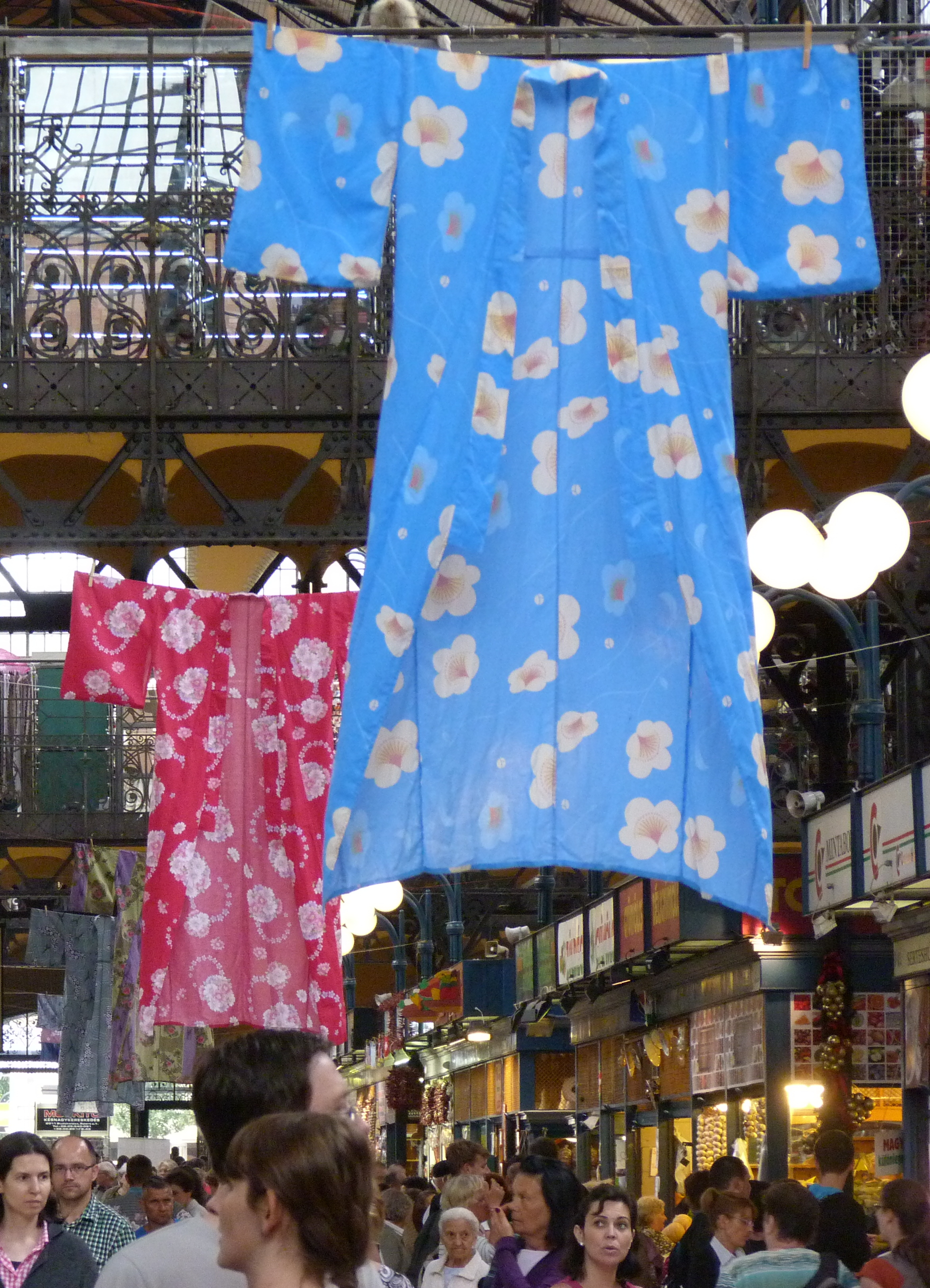
Paper kimono (紙衣, Kamigoromo): Paper decoration

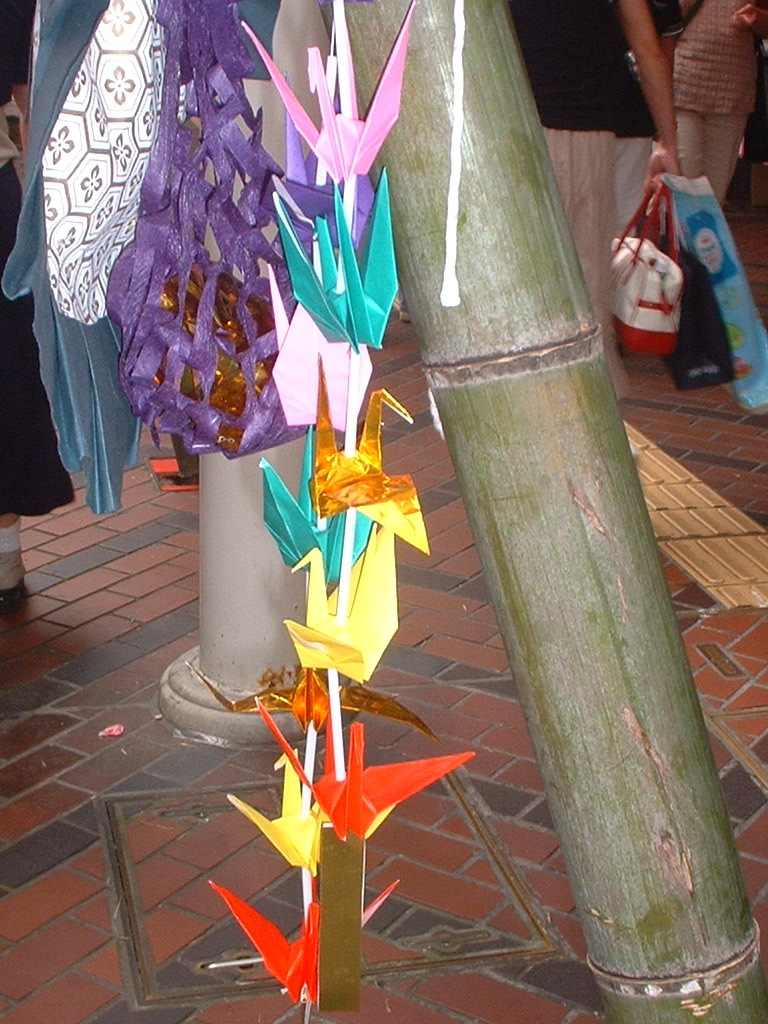
Paper crane (折り鶴, Orizuru): Origami decoration for long life

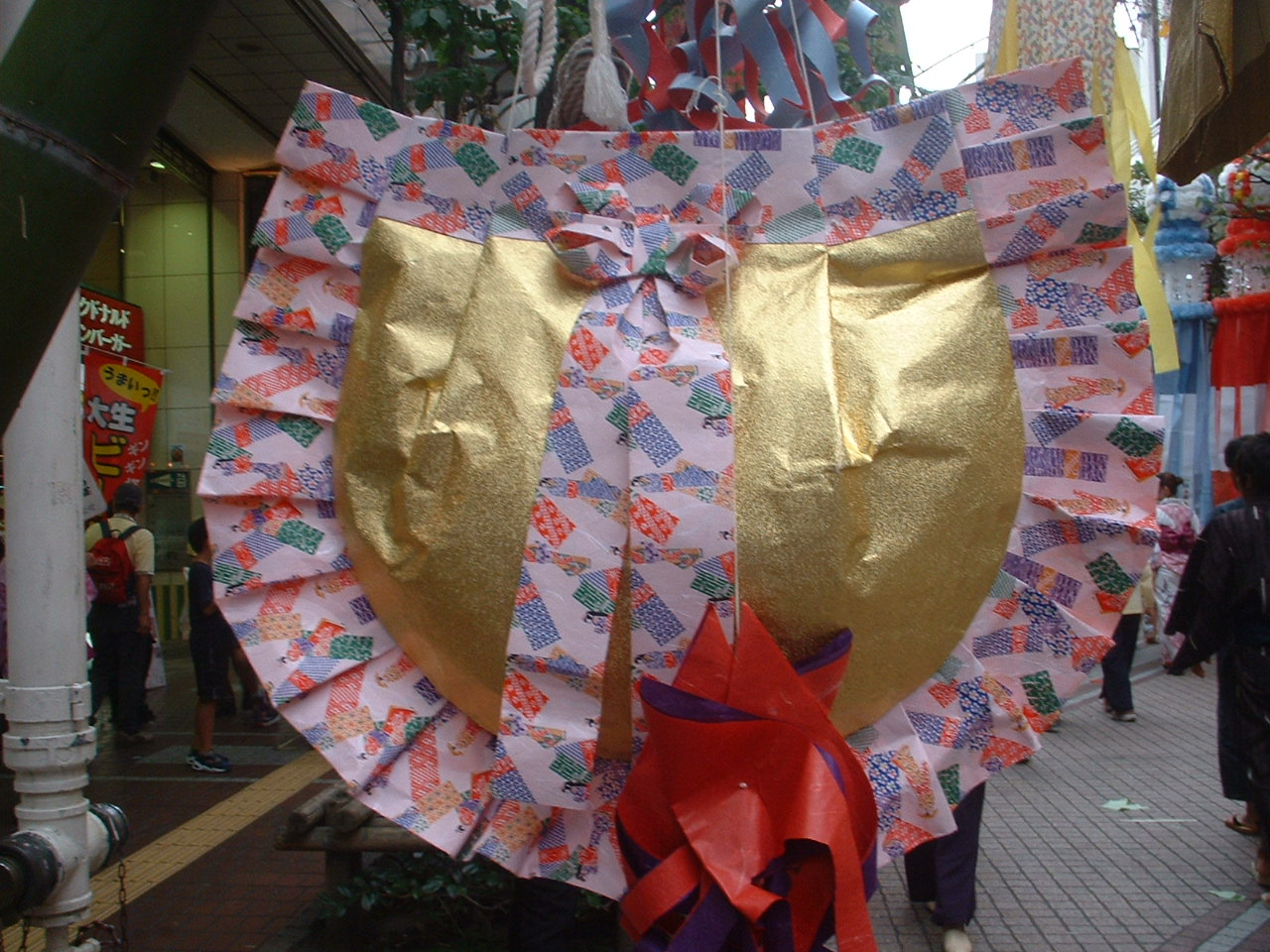
Purse (巾着, Kinchaku): Decoration for good business

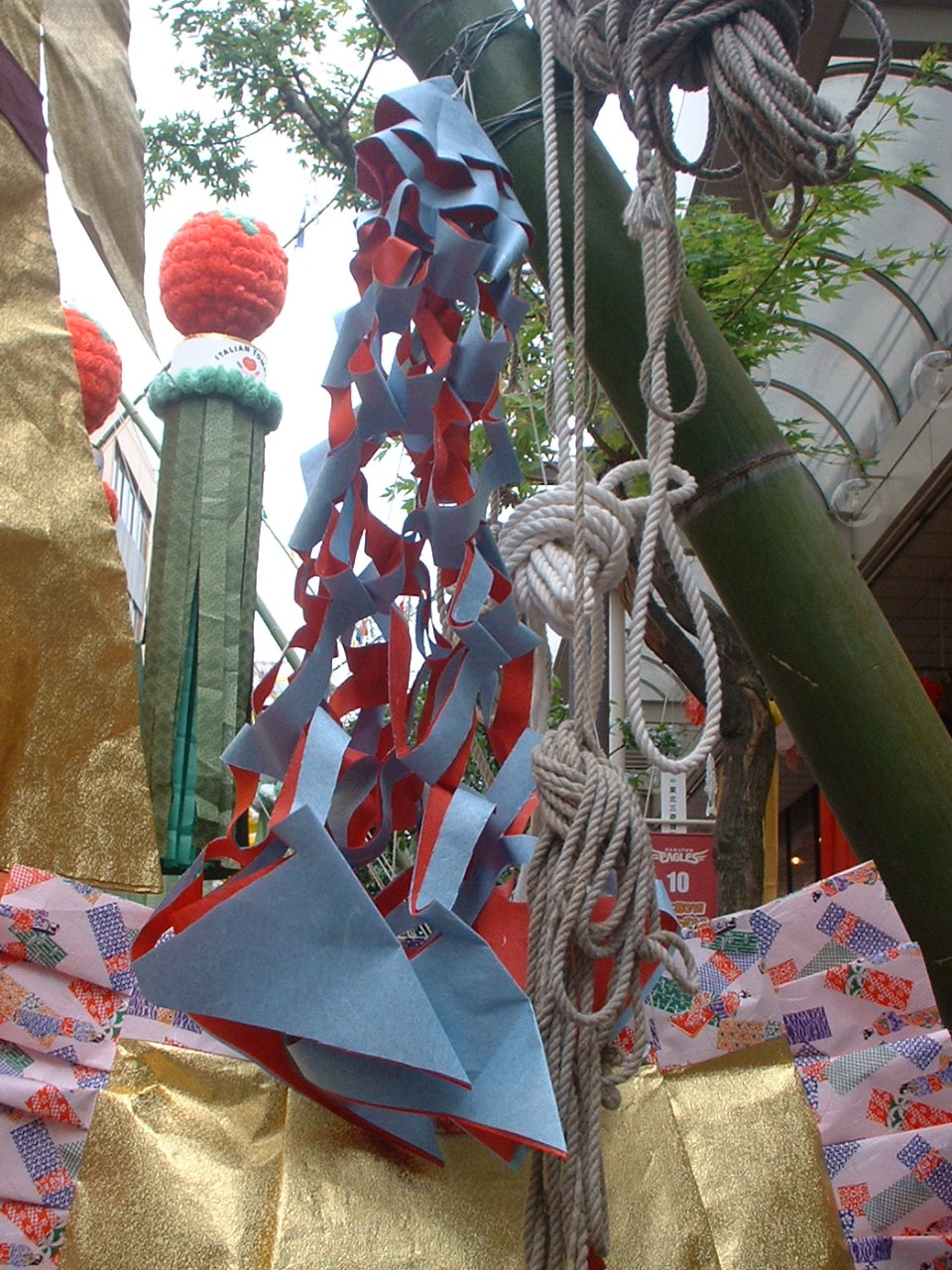
Net (投網, Toami): Paper decoration for good fishing

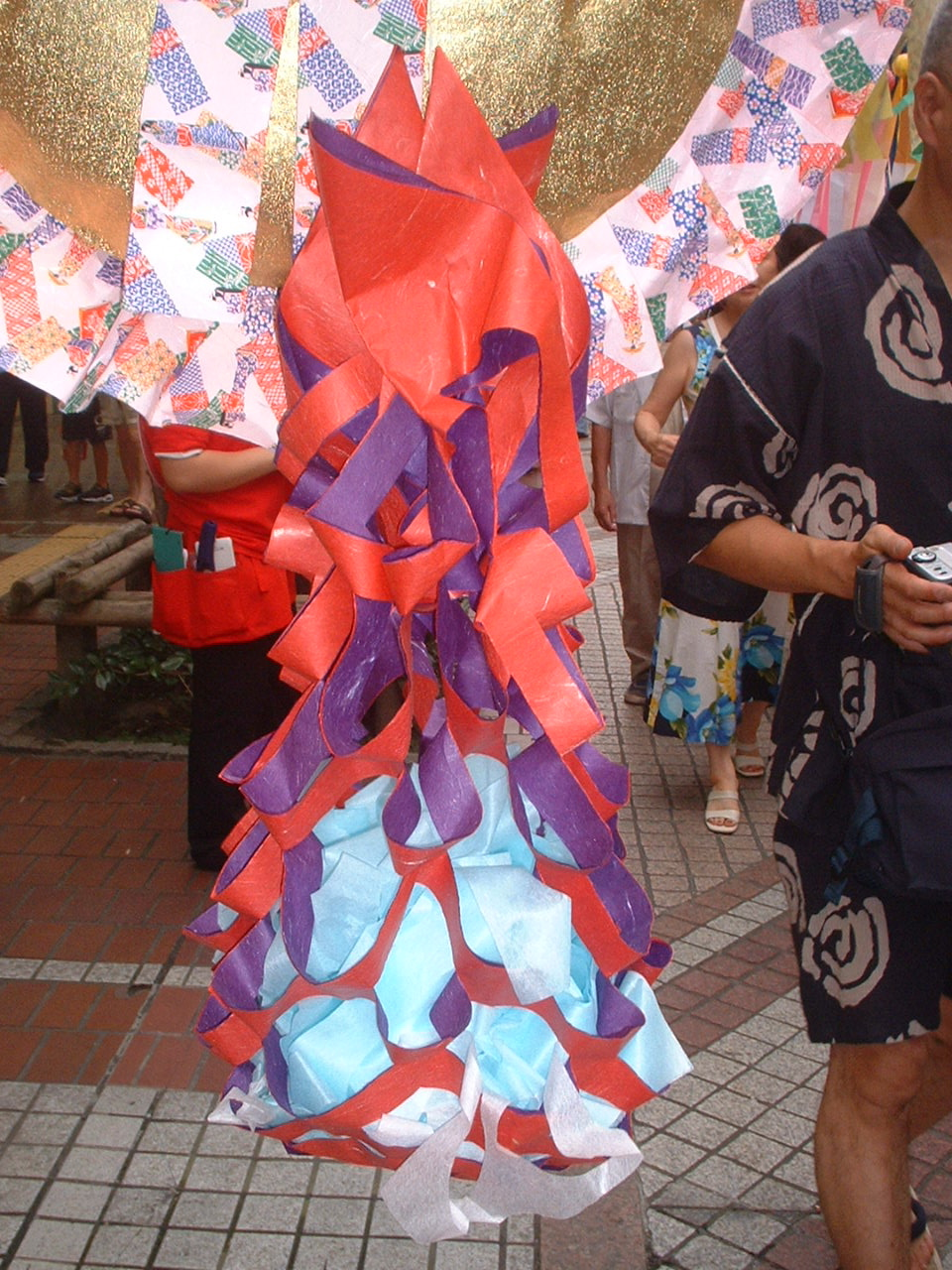
Trash bag (くずかご, Kuzukago): Paper decoration for cleanliness

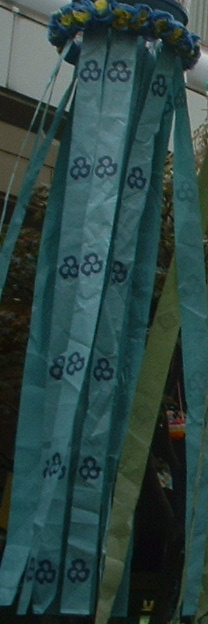
Streamers (吹き流し, Fukinagashi): Paper tubular streamer for improved weaving skills

The ornamental ball (薬玉; Kusudama) often decorated above streamers in present-day Tanabata decorations was originally conceived in 1946 by the owner of a shop in downtown Sendai. The ball was originally modeled after the dahlia flower. In recent years, box-shaped ornaments have become popular alternatives to the ornamental ball. Since 2018, streamers inspired by the costumes of the two-time Olympic figure skating champion Yuzuru Hanyu have been on display at the Zuihōden.

== G8 summit in 2008 ==
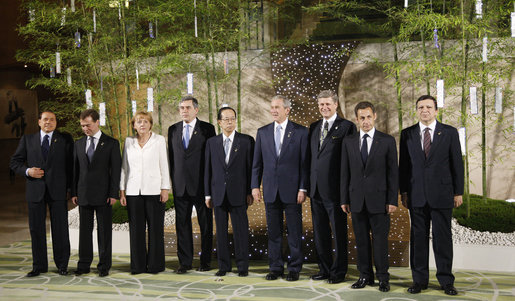
Participating leaders at the 34th G8 summit

In 2008, the 34th G8 summit in Tōyako, Hokkaidō coincided with Tanabata. As host, Japanese Prime Minister Yasuo Fukuda invited the G8 leaders to participate in the spirit of the festival. They were each asked to write a wish on a piece of paper called tanzaku, to hang the tanzaku on a bamboo tree, and then to take the necessary actions to change the world for the better. As a symbolic gesture, the actual writing and the act of hanging up that note is at least a first step.

The Japanese Ministry of Foreign Affairs made colored strips of paper and a bamboo tree for G8 wishes available in Roppongi during the summit. Protesting organizations in Sapporo during the G8 summit also tried to use the spirit of Tanabata to focus attention on a somewhat different set of wishes. Non-governmental organizations including Oxfam and CARE International set up an online wish petition campaign to coincide with the G8 Summit and Tanabata. Outside Japan, Fukuda's timely gesture had unanticipated consequences. For example, the Indian nationally circulated newspaper, The Hindu, picked up on this festival theme by printing an editorial featuring unconventional Tanabata wishes.

Fukuda also invited his fellow citizens to try turning off the lights in their house and stepping outside to enjoy with their family the sight of the Milky Way in the night sky. On 7 July, the Japanese Ministry of the Environment anticipated that over 70,000 facilities and households across Japan would switch off their lights from 20:00 to 22:00 as a symbolic step and as a wish for the future.

== See also ==
- Sekidera Komachi, a famous Noh play set during the Tanabata festival
- Mobara Tanabata Festival
- Qixi Festival
- Chilseok
- Japanese festivals
