= Japanese destroyer Fumizuki =

Two destroyers of the Imperial Japanese Navy were named Fumizuki:

- Japanese destroyer Fumizuki (1906), previously the Russian Silny she was scuttled in 1905 but was raised by Japan and renamed in 1906. She was stricken in 1913.
- Japanese destroyer Fumizuki (1926), a Mutsuki-class destroyer launched in 1926 and sunk in 1944
