= Qixi Festival =

Chinese festival

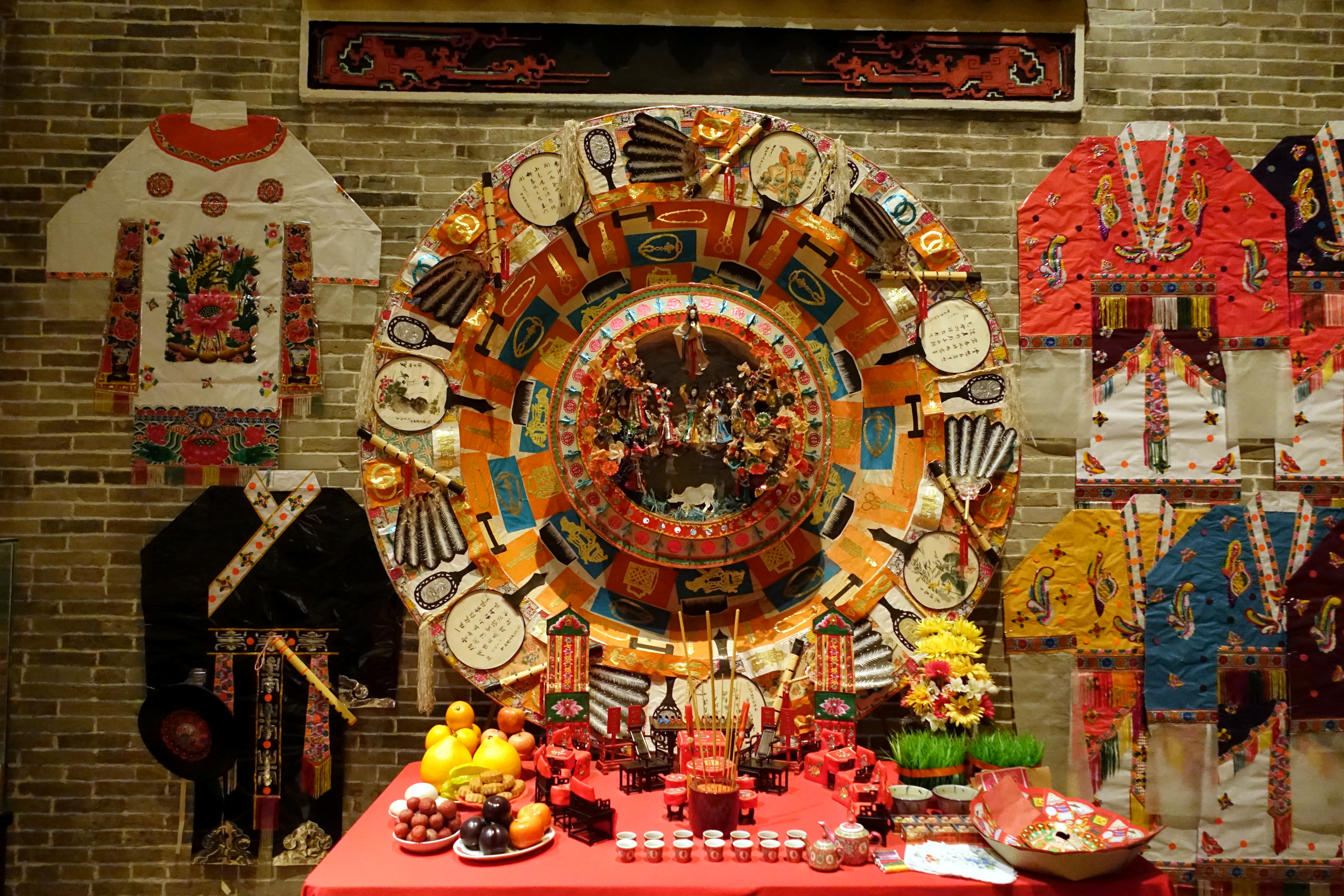
- Qixi offerings from Guangdong, Hong Kong, and Macau at the Hong Kong Museum of History
- Also called: Qiqiao Festival
- Observed by: Chinese
- Type: Cultural, Asian
- Date: 7th day of the 7th lunisolar month
- 2025 date: 29 August
- 2026 date: 19 August
- 2027 date: 8 August
- Related to: Tanabata (Japan), Chilseok (Korea), Thất Tịch (Vietnam)

Chinese name
- Chinese: 七夕
- Literal meaning: "Evening of Sevens"
Transcriptions
Standard Mandarin
- Hanyu Pinyin: qīxī / qīxì
- Bopomofo: ㄑㄧ ㄒㄧ / ㄑㄧ ㄒㄧˋ
- Gwoyeu Romatzyh: chishi/chishih
- Wade–Giles: ch'i^{1}-hsi^{1} / ch'i^{1}-hsi^{4}
- IPA: [tɕʰí.ɕí] / [tɕʰí.ɕî]
Wu
- Suzhounese: tshiq^{7} ziq^{8}
Yue: Cantonese
- Yale Romanization: chāt-jihk
- Jyutping: cat^{1}-zik^{6}
Southern Min
- Tâi-lô: tshit-sia̍h

Qiqiao
- Chinese: 乞巧
- Literal meaning: "beseeching craftsmanship"
Transcriptions
Standard Mandarin
- Hanyu Pinyin: qǐqiǎo
Wu
- Suzhounese: chiq^{7} chiae^{3}

The Qixi Festival (Chinese: 七夕; pinyin: Qīxī; lit. 'Seventh Night [of the seventh month]'), also known as the Qiqiao Festival (Chinese: 乞巧; pinyin: Qǐqiǎo; lit. 'Beseeching craftsmanship'), is a Chinese festival celebrating the annual meeting of Zhinü and Niulang in Chinese mythology. The festival is celebrated on the seventh day of the seventh month on the Chinese lunisolar calendar. It is also celebrated in Vietnam, where it is known as Thất Tịch, and it is the inspiration for the Tanabata festival in Japan and Chilseok in Korea.

A celebration of romantic love, the festival is often described as the traditional Chinese equivalent of Valentine's Day. The festival is derived from Chinese mythology: people celebrate the romantic legend of two lovers, Zhinü and Niulang, who were the weaver girl and the cowherd, respectively. The tale of The Cowherd and the Weaver Girl has been celebrated in the Qixi Festival since the Han dynasty. The earliest-known reference to this famous myth dates back to more than 2,600 years ago, which was told in a poem from the Classic of Poetry.

The festival has variously been called the Double Seventh Festival, the Chinese Valentine's Day, the Night of Sevens, or the Magpie Festival.

== Origin ==
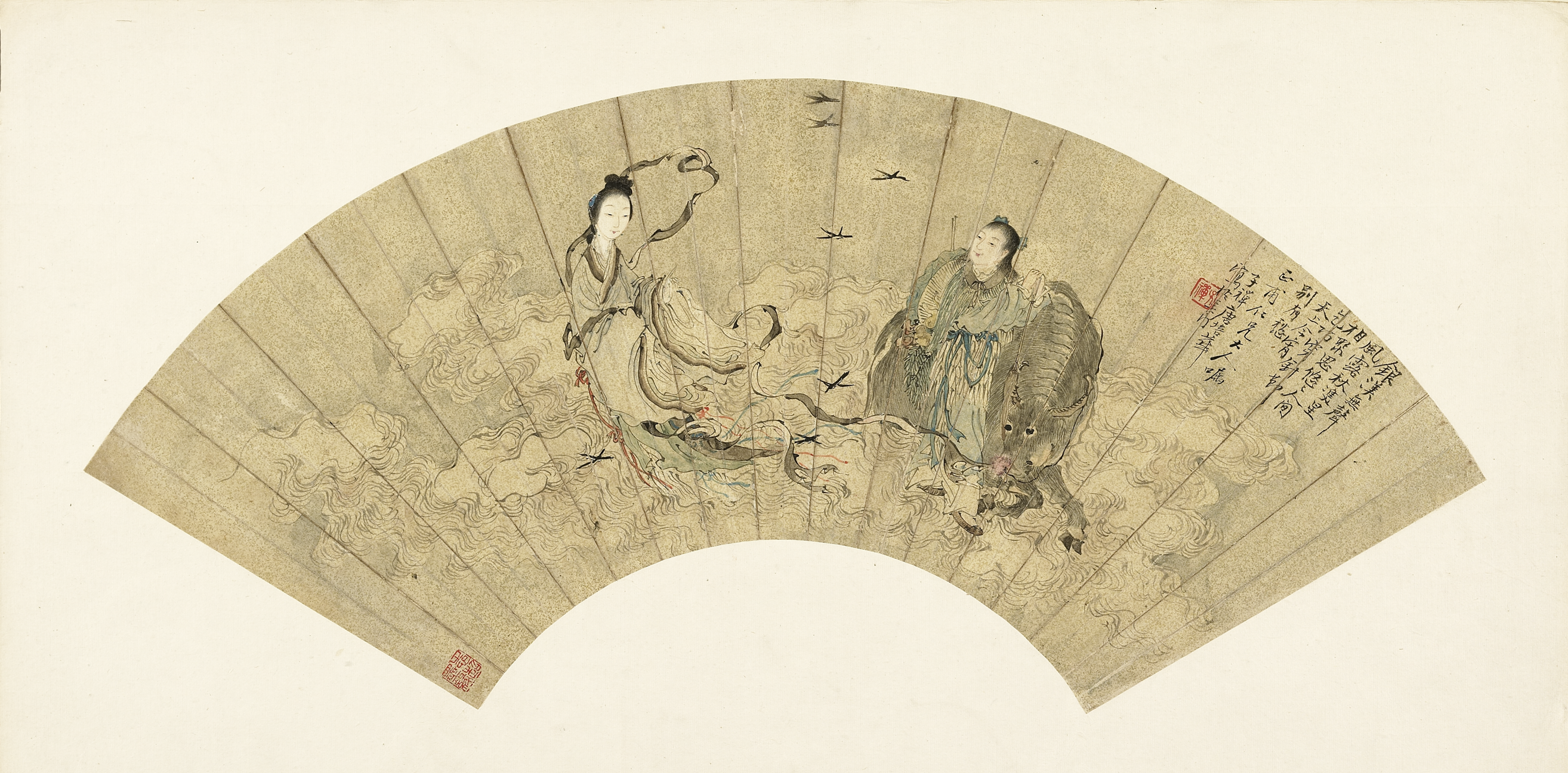
The reunion of The Weaver Girl and the Cowherd on the bridge of magpies, Qing dynasty fan painting

The popular tale is a love story between Zhinü (織女, the weaver girl, symbolizing Vega) and Niulang (牛郎, the cowherd, symbolizing Altair). Niulang was often abused by his sister-in-law. They eventually kicked him out of the house, and gave him nothing but an old cow. One day, the old cow suddenly spoke out, telling Niulang that there would be fairies bathing in the spring nearby that night. The fairy would stay there if she failed to go back to heaven before morning. In accordance with what the old cow said, Niulang saw those beautiful fairies in the spring, and fell in love with one of the beautiful fairies who was the heavenly weaver. In order to make her stay, he took her clothes that helped her to go back to heaven; this made her an ordinary earth woman without any power. They then got married and had two children.

The Emperor of Heaven (玉皇大帝, lit. 'The Jade Emperor') found out about this and was furious, so he sent minions to escort the heavenly weaver back to heaven. Niulang was heartbroken. The old cow suddenly spoke out again, telling Niulang he could take his skin to make it into a flying coat to chase after them; and Niulang did. However, the Queen Mother of the West drew a Silver River (The Milky Way) in the sky and blocked his way. Meanwhile, the love between Niulang and the weaver moved the magpie, and so they built a bridge of magpies over the Silver River for them to meet. The Emperor of Heaven was also moved by the sight, and allowed this couple to meet on the Magpie Bridge once a year on the seventh day of the seventh lunar month. That was the origin of the Qixi Festival.

== Traditions ==
During the Han dynasty, the practices were conducted in accordance with formal ceremonial state rituals. Over time, the festival activities also included customs that the common people partook in.

Girls take part in worshipping the celestials (拜仙) during rituals. They go to the local temple to pray to Zhinü for wisdom. Paper items are usually burned as offerings. Girls may recite traditional prayers for dexterity in needlework, which symbolizes the traditional talents of a good spouse. Divination could take place to determine the possible dexterity in needlework. They make wishes for marrying someone who would be a good and loving husband. During the festival, girls make a display of their domestic skills. Traditionally, there would be contests amongst those who attempted to be the best in threading needles under low-light conditions, like the glow of an ember or of a half moon. Today, girls sometimes gather toiletries in honour of the seven maidens.

The festival also held an importance for newlywed couples. Traditionally, they would worship the celestial couple for the last time and bid farewell to them (辭仙). The celebration stood as a symbol for a happy marriage and showed that the married woman was treasured by her new family.

On this day, the Chinese gaze up at the sky to look for Vega and Altair shining in the Milky Way, while Deneb, a third star, forms a symbolic bridge between the two stars. It was said that if it rains on this day, it was caused by a river sweeping away the magpie bridge or that the rain is the tears of the separated couple. Based on the legend of a flock of magpies forming a bridge to reunite the couple, a pair of magpies came to symbolize conjugal happiness and faithfulness.

The eating customs of Qixi Festival vary from place to place, and are called eating Qiao food. The most famous traditional food people eat on Qixi Festival is Qiao Guo, which has a history of more than one thousand years since it became popular during the Song dynasty. The main ingredients are flour, oil, and honey, sometimes adding sesame, peanuts, kernels, roses, and other different ingredients. After mixing those ingredients, the people then deep-fry them. Beyond that, people would eat crunchy candy, refreshments, and fruits together, expressing the people's pursuit of ingenuity, family health, and happy life wishes.

== Literature ==
Many pieces of literature, such as poems, songs, and operas, have been written for this festival and about the Cowherd and the Weaver Girl, dating back to the Zhou dynasty Classic of Poetry. Many describe the atmosphere of the festival or narrate related stories. This has left a valuable literary legacy which helps modern scholars better understand ancient Chinese customs, feelings, and opinions relating to the festival.

迢迢牽牛星 – 佚名（東漢） Far, Far Away, the Cowherd – Anonymous (a Han dynasty yuefu)

迢迢牽牛星， Far, far away, the Cowherd,
皎皎河漢女。 Fair, fair, the Weaving Maid;
纖纖擢素手， Nimbly move her slender white fingers,
札札弄機杼。 Click-clack goes her spinning-loom.
終日不成章， All day she weaves, yet her web is still not done
泣涕零如雨。 And her tears fall like rain.
河漢清且淺， Clear and shallow the Milky Way,
相去復幾許？ They are not far apart!
盈盈一水間， But the stream brims always between
脈脈不得語。 And, gazing at each other, they cannot speak.

(Translated by Yang Xianyi and Gladys Yang)

秋夕–杜牧（唐朝） An Autumn Night – Du Mu (Tang dynasty)

銀燭秋光冷畫屏， A candle flame flickers against a dull painted screen on a cool autumn night,
輕羅小扇撲流螢。 She holds a small silk fan to flap away dashing fireflies.
天階夜色涼如水， Above her hang celestial bodies as frigid as deep water,
坐看牽牛織女星。 She sat there watching Altair of Aquila and Vega of Lyra pining for each other in the sky.

(Translated by Betty Tseng)

鵲橋仙–秦觀（宋朝） Immortals at the Magpie Bridge – Qin Guan (Song dynasty)

纖雲弄巧， Clouds float like works of art,
飛星傳恨， Stars shoot with grief at heart.
銀漢迢迢暗渡。 Across the Milky Way the Cowherd meets the Maid.
金風玉露一相逢， When Autumn's Golden Wind embraces Dew of Jade,
便勝却人間無數。 All the love scenes on earth, however many, fade.
柔情似水， Their tender love flows like a stream;
佳期如夢， Their happy date seems but a dream.
忍顧鶴橋歸路。 How can they bear a separate homeward way?
兩情若是久長時， If love between both sides can last for aye,
又豈在朝朝暮暮。 Why need they stay together night and day?

(Translated by Xu Yuanchong)

== Gallery ==
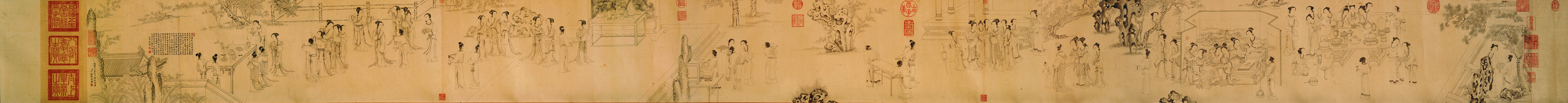
Ladies on the 'Night of Sevens' Pleading for Skills by Ding Guanpeng, 1748

== Other ==
Interactive Google doodles have been launched since the 2009 Qixi Festival to mark the occasion. The latest was launched for the 2023 Qixi Festival. The Qixi festival inspired the Tanabata festival in Japan, Chilseok festival in Korea, and Thất Tịch festival in Vietnam.

== See also ==
- Qingming Festival
- Qixi Tribute
- Seven Sisters' Fruit
- Shangsi Festival

== Bibliography ==
Offline

- Brown, Ju; Brown, John (2006). China, Japan, Korea: Culture and customs. North Charleston: BookSurge. ISBN 1-4196-4893-4.
- Kiang, Heng Chye (1999). Cities of aristocrats and bureaucrats: The development of medieval Chinese cityscapes. Singapore: Singapore University Press. ISBN 9971-69-223-6.
- Lai, Sufen Sophia (1999). "Father in Heaven, Mother in Hell: Gender politics in the creation and transformation of Mulian's mother". Presence and presentation: Women in the Chinese literati tradition. New York: St. Martin's Press. ISBN 0-312-21054-X.
- Melton, J. Gordon; Baumann, Martin (2010). "The Double Seventh Festival". Religions of the world: A comprehensive encyclopedia of beliefs and practices (2nd ed.). Santa Barbara: ABC-CLIO. ISBN 978-1-59884-203-6.
- Poon, Shuk-wah (2011). Negotiating religion in modern China: State and common people in Guangzhou, 1900–1937. Hong Kong: Chinese University of Hong Kong. ISBN 978-962-996-421-4.
- Schomp, Virginia (2009). The ancient Chinese. New York: Marshall Cavendish Benchmark. ISBN 978-0-7614-4216-5.
- Stepanchuk, Carol; Wong, Charles (1991). Mooncakes and hungry ghosts: Festivals of China. San Francisco: China Books & Periodicals. ISBN 0-8351-2481-9.
- Welch, Patricia Bjaaland (2008). Chinese art: A guide to motifs and visual imagery. North Clarendon: Tuttle Publishing. ISBN 978-0-8048-3864-1.
- Zhao, Rongguang (2015). A History of Food Culture in China. SCPG Publishing Corporation. ISBN 978-1-938368-16-5.

Online

- "Ladies on the 'Night of Sevens' Pleading for Skills". Dublin: Chester Beatty Library.
