= Chilseok =

Festival celebrated in Korea

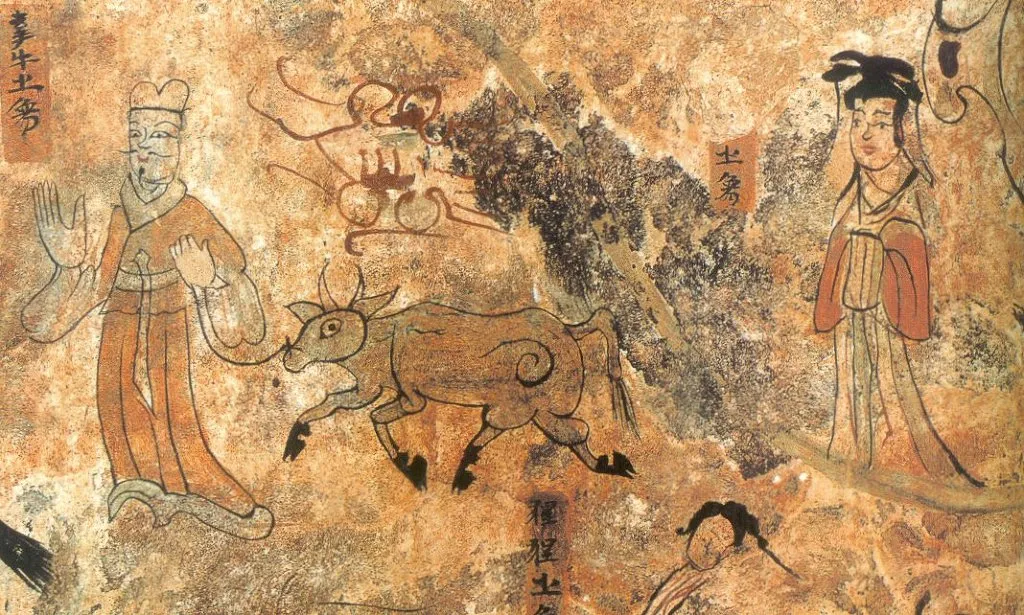
- Gyeonu and Jiknyeo about to part, as depicted in a Goguryeo mural painting from the Tokhung-ri Tomb, 408 CE.
- Date: 7th day of the 7th lunar month
- 2025 date: 29 August 2025
- 2026 date: 19 August 2026
- 2027 date: 8 August 2027

- Chilseok
- Hangul: 칠석
- Hanja: 七夕
- RR: Chilseok
- MR: Ch'ilsŏk

Chilseok (Korean: 칠석; lit. 'Seventh Evening') is a Korean traditional festival which falls on the seventh day of the seventh month of the Korean lunisolar calendar, originating from the Chinese Qixi Festival. Chilseok is a period where the heat starts to dwindle and the wet season begins, and the rain that falls during this period is called Chilseok water. As pumpkins, cucumbers, and melons start to flourish during this period, people traditionally offered fried pumpkins to the Big Dipper.

== The story of Chilseok ==
The origin of the tale is a romantic Chinese folk tale, The Cowherd and the Weaver Girl. (Note: Orientalist William Elliot Griffis translated the story as The Sky Bridge of Birds, and renamed the characters Weaver Maiden and Cattle Prince.) It was adopted by Koreans. According to the Korean version, a heavenly king had a daughter called Jiknyeo (직녀; 織女), who was a talented weaver. One day, when she looked out of the window while weaving, she saw a young man, a herder called Gyeonu (견우; 牽牛), just across the Milky Way, and fell in love with him; the father allowed the two to marry. Afterwards, Jiknyeo refused to weave clothes, and Gyeonu did not take good care of the cows and sheep. The king got very angry, and ordered the couple to live separately, allowing them to meet only once a year. On the seventh day of the seventh month of each year, they were excited to meet each other, but could not cross the Milky Way. However, crows and magpies worked together to form a bridge across the Milky Way for the couple. After a while, their sadness returned, for they were forced to wait another year before meeting again. It is believed crows and magpies have no feathers on their heads because of the couple stepping on their heads. If it rains on that night, it is believed to be the couple's tears.

== Chilseok customs ==
On Chilseok, Koreans traditionally take baths for good health. In addition, it is traditional to eat wheat flour noodles and grilled wheat cakes. Chilseok is known as the last chance to enjoy wheat-based foods, since the cold winds after Chilseok ruin the scent of wheat. People also used to eat wheat pancakes called miljeonbyeong (밀전병), and sirutteok, a steamed rice cake covered with azuki beans.

== See also ==
- Korean calendar
- Qixi Festival
- Tanabata
- Dumuzid
- Inanna
- The Heavenly Maiden and the Woodcutter
