= University of Sydney School of Physics =

University school in Australia

School of Physics
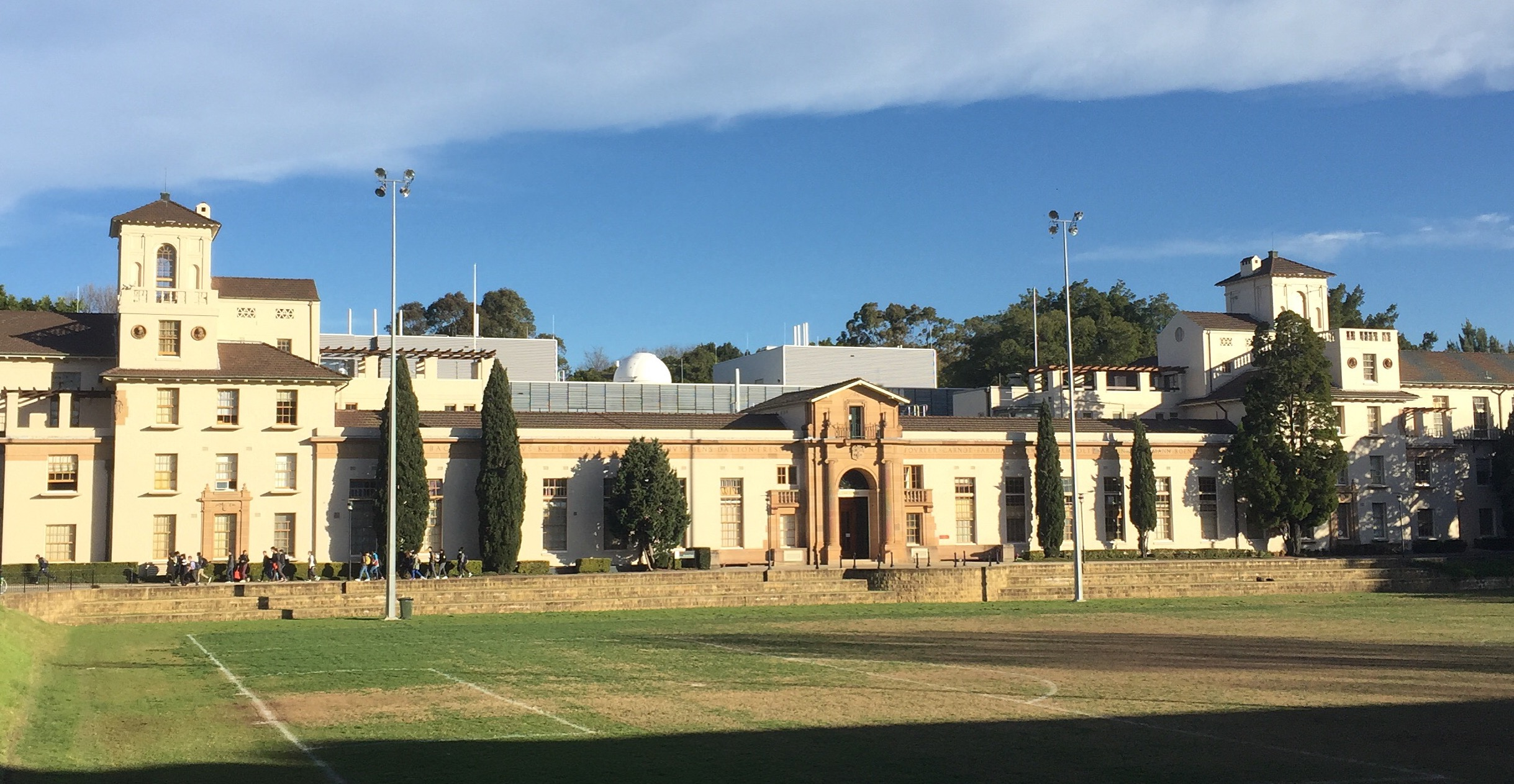
- Type: Public
- Affiliations: University of Sydney
- Head of School: Tara Murphy
- Location: Camperdown / Darlington, Sydney, Australia; 33.888025°S 151.187134°E
- Website: sydney.edu.au/science/physics

The School of Physics is a constituent body of the Faculty of Science at the University of Sydney, Australia.

== History ==
Physics was first taught at the tertiary level in Australia at the University of Sydney, beginning in 1852. After the establishment of the Faculty of Science in 1882, the School was established as a distinct entity within the Faculty.

=== Physics Department, the Makinsons and the "Bailey Boys" ===
Before being the School of Physics, it was simply the Physics Department.

Condensed matter physicist Richard E. B. Makinson lectured at the department, although was never promoted to professor, because, according to Phillip Deery, of his Communist political views. His wife Kathleen Rachel Makinson, who studied physics at the University of Cambridge before moving to Australia in 1939, worked at the Department during World War 2 as both Research Assistant and Research Scholar. She helped with courses taught to the so-called "Bailey Boys", which were courses in radar techniques and electronics given by the Department to (mainly) RAAF personnel, and worked on classified wartime radar projects. The name "Bailey Boys" came from professor V. A. Bailey at the department.

The chairpersonship of the department was vacant from 1946 until 1952. Although several people had been approached, including Bernard Lovell, no-one accepted the position. Colin Keay, physics professor at the University of Newcastle and reviews editor of Australian Physics, characterized the department at that time as "run-down". Professor M. L. Oliphant, who wrote to Lovell on 13 May 1947, told Lovell that physics in the university "has not been in the forefront for some time" and that "the place needs a man who is prepared to go into it in rather a bull-headed fashion and drive through the apathy which has gripped it".

=== Foundation and heads of the School ===
From its founding in the 1950s until 1987, the first head of the School was Harry Messel, who was responsible for the creation of its original 14 permanent academic appointments. Keay describes Messel as "a remarkable professor" who "in little more than a year" turned the Physics Department into "a world-class facility" and "broadened it into a diverse School of eventually eight Departments". Messel overlooked some loyal employees including Phyllis Mary Nicol who he thought of as a coach rather than a lecturer.

Early work in the School included cosmic ray and low temperature physics research by Dr Stuart Butler and Dr John Blatt. At Messel's instigation it was visited by mathematician J. E. Moyal. Messel encouraged recognition of the School's benefactors by having Departments, Chairs, and Laboratories named after them.

By 1960, the School had its own computing department, and a computer named SILLIAC, one of only two computers in New South Wales. Blatt had persuaded Messel that the department needed an electronic computer for theoretical work, and it had been paid for, in large part, by an A$50,000 (equivalent to $2,436,379 in 2022) donation, which was then doubled, from a Sydney jewellery store owner named Adolph Basser, his winnings from when his horse named Delta had won the 1951 Melbourne Cup. Named after the donor, the Basser Laboratory in the School of Physics was later to become the Basser Department of Computer Science.

The Chatterton Astronomy Department was named for donor Stanley Chatterton, co-founder of Woolworths, and built Sydney University's Stellar Interferometer (SUSI) at Narrabi Observatory in 1991 for A$2,950,000 (equivalent to $6,335,470 in 2022).

The Falkiner Department of Nuclear Physics, later to become the Falkiner Department of High Energy Physics, was named for F. B. S. Falkiner, the father of George B. S. Falkiner, a property owner in Warren who donated A$52,000 (equivalent to $2,036,802 in 2022) in 1954 towards creating it. Its first research appointment was Paul George from Imperial College London, and one of the department's early experiments conducted by Donald Millar and Henri Rathgeber was two underground cloud chambers in an abandoned gun emplacement in Sydney Harbour at South Head.

Other Falkiner Department experiments included measuring Cherenkov radiation at what was then Badgery's Creek Farm, but was later to be the Fleurs Observatory, using a telescope, photomultiplier, and reflector, all mounted in a dustbin.

Basser himself went on to be a foundation governor of the Nuclear Research Foundation, and at Messel's instigation the university later awarded Basser, Falkiner, and Cecil Green honorary degrees.

Dr Anne Green, the third woman radio astronomer in Australia, was a professor at the School and its head in 2008.

=== Mills ===
Australian radio astronomy pioneer Bernie Mills left CSIRO Radiophysics Lab (RPL) for the School in May 1960. He had been recruited by Messell, who offered him the opportunity to build a larger "SuperCross" version of his Mills Cross. He was officially approved as a Reader at the School by the University Senate in June 1960, with a grant of A$100,000 (equivalent to $3,328,101 in 2022) and a further A$10,000 (equivalent to $332,810 in 2022) for running costs for a new radio astronomy department in the School.

=== Other people ===
U.K. astronomer Richard Q. Twiss worked with Robert Hanbury Brown at the School in the 1960s, on the Narrabri Stellar Intensity Interferometer.

Two prominent benefactors of the school in the 1980s were philanthropists Cecil and Ida Green, who endowed two Research Fellowships at the school, named after Messell, in 1980 and 1983.

=== Rivalries ===
Various academic and institutional rivalries have existed over the years.

The School of Physics recorded telemetry from Sputnik 2, but wouldn't release the data to Russian researchers S. N. Vernov and A. E. Chudakov, leading them to miss the discovery of a radiation belt. When asked about this in 1959, Messell said that this was in response to the Russians not giving them the codes to the telemetry data: "They would not send us the code and we were not about to send them the data".

The departure of Mills for the School strained relationships between it and CSIRO RPL, two institutions that were physically only a few hundred metres from each other; although there was a large exodus of astronomers from RPL at the time, driven by funding cutbacks as research was concentrated upon the Parkes Radio Telescope and the Culgoora Radio Heliograph at the expense of smaller projects. The RPL had already been suffering from internal schisms, and Joe Pawsey wrote a report for CSIRO in 1960 recognizing that things like Mills's proposed improved Cross could not have been funded by CSIRO because of funds being tied up by the GRT at Parkes.

The affiliations listed for Cyril Hazard in his 1963 papers in Nature only served to increase the division between the two institutions. Hazard was on staff at the School, but was listed solely as affiliated with the RPL, which the School took to be a dishonest academic snub. The editors of Nature were blamed for this error, when they reformatted for publication what had been originally submitted as a letter into (as they believed it should be) a full article, moving the authorship from the end of the letter (the usual position for letters) to the head of the article (the usual position for articles) and losing Hazard's note in an acknowledgement at the end of the letter about being from "the Narrabri Observatory of the School of Physics of the University of Sydney" in doing so. There was a correction in a subsequent edition, but CSIRO RPL did not distance itself from the mistake, and on the original manuscript of the letter as submitted for publication, someone had in fact written "delete" next to Hazard's School of Physics address.
