= Bose–Einstein correlations =

In astronomy, optics and particle physics, the Bose–Einstein correlations refer to correlations between identical bosons (like the photon, the quanta of light).

== Description ==
The interference between two (or more) waves establishes a correlation between these waves.

In optics, two beams of light are said to interfere coherently, when the phase difference between their waves is constant; if this phase difference is random or changing the beams are incoherent.

In quantum mechanics, where to each particle there is associated a wave function, we encounter thus interference and correlations between two (or more) particles, described mathematically by second or higher order correlation functions. (Note: The correlation function of order n defines the transition amplitudes between states containing n particles.) These correlations have quite specific properties for identical particles. We then distinguish Bose–Einstein correlations for bosons and Fermi–Dirac correlations for fermions. While in Fermi–Dirac second order correlations the particles are antibunched, in Bose–Einstein correlations they are bunched. Another distinction between Bose–Einstein and Fermi–Dirac correlation is that only Bose–Einstein correlations can present quantum coherence.

The coherent superposition of wave amplitudes is called first order interference. In analogy to that we have intensity or second order Hanbury Brown and Twiss (HBT) interference, which generalizes the interference between amplitudes to that between squares of amplitudes, i.e. between intensities.

=== Principle of indistinguishable particles ===
As long as the number of particles of a quantum system is fixed the system can be described by a wave function, which contains all the information about the state of that system. This is the first quantization approach and historically Bose–Einstein and Fermi–Dirac correlations were derived through this wave function formalism. In high-energy physics, however, one is faced with processes where particles are produced and absorbed and this demands a more general field theoretical approach called second quantization. This is the approach on which quantum optics is based and it is only through this more general approach that quantum statistical coherence, lasers and condensates could be interpreted or discovered. Another more recent phenomenon discovered via this approach is the Bose–Einstein correlation between particles and antiparticles.

The wave function of two identical particles is symmetric or antisymmetric with respect to the permutation of the two particles, depending whether one considers identical bosons or identical fermions. For non-identical particles there is no permutation symmetry and according to the wave function formalism there should be no Bose–Einstein or Fermi–Dirac correlation between these particles. This applies in particular for a pair of particles made of a positive and a negative pions. However this is true only in a first approximation: If one considers the possibility that a positive and a negative pion are virtually related in the sense that they can annihilate and transform into a pair of two neutral pions (or two photons), i.e. a pair of identical particles, we are faced with a more complex situation, which has to be handled within the second quantisation approach. This leads, to a new kind of Bose–Einstein correlations, namely between positive and negative pions, albeit much weaker than that between two positive or two negative pions. On the other hand, there is no such correlation between a charged and a neutral pion. Loosely speaking a positive and a negative pion are less unequal than a positive and a neutral pion. Similarly the Bose–Einstein correlations between two neutral pions are somewhat stronger than those between two identically charged ones: in other words two neutral pions are “more identical” than two negative (positive) pions.

The surprising nature of these special Bose–Einstein correlations effects made headlines in the literature. These effects illustrate the superiority of the field theoretical second quantisation approach as compared with the wave function formalism. They also illustrate the limitations of the analogy between optical and particle physics interferometry: They prove that Bose–Einstein correlations between two photons are different from those between two identically charged pions, an issue which had led to misunderstandings in the theoretical literature and which was elucidated in.

== History ==
The concept of higher order or quantum coherence of sources was introduced in quantum optics by Roy J. Glauber. While initially it was used mainly to explain the functioning of masers and lasers, it was soon realized that it had important applications in other fields of physics, as well: under appropriate conditions quantum coherence leads to Bose–Einstein condensation. As the names suggest Bose–Einstein correlations and Bose–Einstein condensation are both consequences of Bose–Einstein statistics, and thus applicable not only to photons but to any kind of bosons. Thus Bose–Einstein condensation is at the origin of such important condensed matter phenomena as superconductivity and superfluidity, and Bose–Einstein correlations manifest themselves also in hadron interferometry.

Almost in parallel to the invention by Robert Hanbury-Brown and Richard Twiss of intensity interferometry in optics, Gerson Goldhaber, Sulamith Goldhaber, Wonyong Lee, and Abraham Pais (GGLP) discovered that identically charged pions produced in antiproton-proton annihilation processes were bunched, while pions of opposite charges were not. They interpreted this effect as due to Bose–Einstein statistics. Subsequently it was realized that the HBT effect is also a Bose–Einstein correlation effect, that of identical photons. (Note: That it took quite a long time to establish this connection is due in part to the fact that in HBT interferometry one measures distance correlations while in GGLP momentum correlations.)

The most general theoretical formalism for Bose–Einstein correlations in subnuclear physics is the quantum statistical approach, based on the classical current and coherent state, formalism: it includes quantum coherence, correlation lengths and correlation times.

Starting with the 1980s Bose–Einstein correlations has become a subject of current interest in high-energy physics and at present meetings entirely dedicated to this subject take place. (Note: This trend was inaugurated by the meeting Correlations and Multiparticle Production-CAMP the Proceedings of which were edited by M. Plümer, S. Raha and R. M. Weiner, World Scientific 1990, ISBN 981-02-0331-4.) One reason for this interest is the fact that Bose–Einstein correlations are up to now the only method for the determination of sizes and lifetimes of sources of elementary particles. This is of particular interest for the ongoing search of quark matter in the laboratory: To reach this phase of matter a critical energy density is necessary. To measure this energy density one must determine the volume of the fireball in which this matter is supposed to have been generated and this means the determination of the size of the source; that can be achieved by the method of intensity interferometry. Furthermore, a phase of matter means a quasi-stable state, i.e. a state which lives longer than the duration of the collision that gave rise to this state. This means that we have to measure the lifetime of the new system, which can again be obtained by Bose–Einstein correlations only.

== Hadron interferometry ==
Bose–Einstein correlations of hadrons can also be used for the determination of quantum coherence in strong interactions. To detect and measure coherence in Bose–Einstein correlations in nuclear and particle physics has been quite a difficult task, because these correlations are rather insensitive to even large admixtures of coherence, because of other competing processes which could simulate this effect and also because often experimentalists did not use the appropriate formalism in the interpretation of their data.

The most clear evidence for coherence in Bose–Einstein correlations comes from the measurement of higher order correlations in antiproton-proton reactions at the CERN Super Proton–Antiproton Synchrotron by the UA1-Minimum Bias collaboration. This experiment has also a particular significance because it tests in quite an unusual way the predictions of quantum statistics as applied to Bose–Einstein correlations: it represents an unsuccessful attempt of falsification of the theory. Besides these practical applications of Bose–Einstein correlations in interferometry, the quantum statistical approach has led to quite an unexpected heuristic application, related to the principle of identical particles, the fundamental starting point of Bose–Einstein correlations.
