= Mrinal Kumar Das Gupta =

Indian astronomer

Mrinal Kumar Das Gupta FNI
- মৃণাল কুমার দাসগুপ্ত
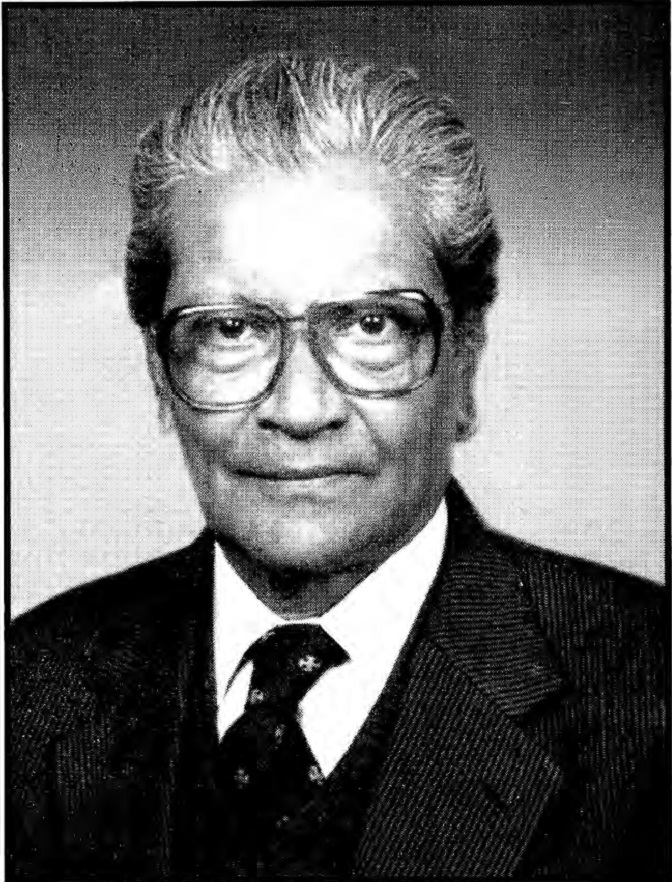
- Prof. Mrinal Kumar Das Gupta
- Born: 1 September 1923; Barisal District, Bengal (now in Bangladesh)
- Died: 28 November 2005 (aged 82); Kolkata, West Bengal, India
- Education: St. Gregory's School, Dacca; Dacca University (B.Sc, M.Sc); Manchester University,(PhD), 1954
- Known for: Discovery of the first double radio source Cygnus A; First Intensity interferometer; First to design, fabricate and operate a long base line post detection correlator radio interferometer; Cygnus A and Cassiopeia A; first indirect evidence of black hole
- Awards: SK Mitra Memorial Lecture Award of INSA (1990); Fellow of the National Institute of Science, (now known as Indian National Science Academy); Fellow of the Indian Academy of Sciences, Bangalore
- Scientific career
- Fields: Physics; Astronomy; Radio Astronomy
- Workplaces: University of Calcutta; Lecturer of Institute of radio physics and electronics, Kolkata; Jodrell Bank Observatory; Astronomical Society of India, 1990

Mrinal Kumar Das Gupta FNI (1 September 1923 – 28 November 2005, Kolkata) was an Indian astronomer. He was born in erstwhile Barishal district in present-day Bangladesh. He received his BSc and MSc degrees in physics from Dhaka University in 1944 and 1945 respectively. Later he joined the department of Radio Physics and Electronics of the University of Calcutta as a researcher.

In 1954, he obtained his Ph.D. from the University of Manchester. Later he became the head of the department of the Institute of Radio Physics and Electronics at Calcutta University. Das Gupta worked with Robert Hanbury Brown and Roger Jennison, in building the first intensity interferometers at radio wavelength in the early 1950s and measured the apparent angular structures of two radio sources, Cygnus A and Cassiopeia A. Das Gupta was elected as a Fellow of the National Academy of Science in 1974 by the Indian National Science Academy, New Delhi and as a Fellow of the Academy of Science by the Indian Academy of Sciences, Bangalore. He was also the member of the now-infamous committee that investigated Dr. Subhash Mukhopadhyay who created the world's second and India's first child using in-vitro fertilisation. He died on 28 November 2005 in Kolkata.
