= Aruvankadu =

- Village
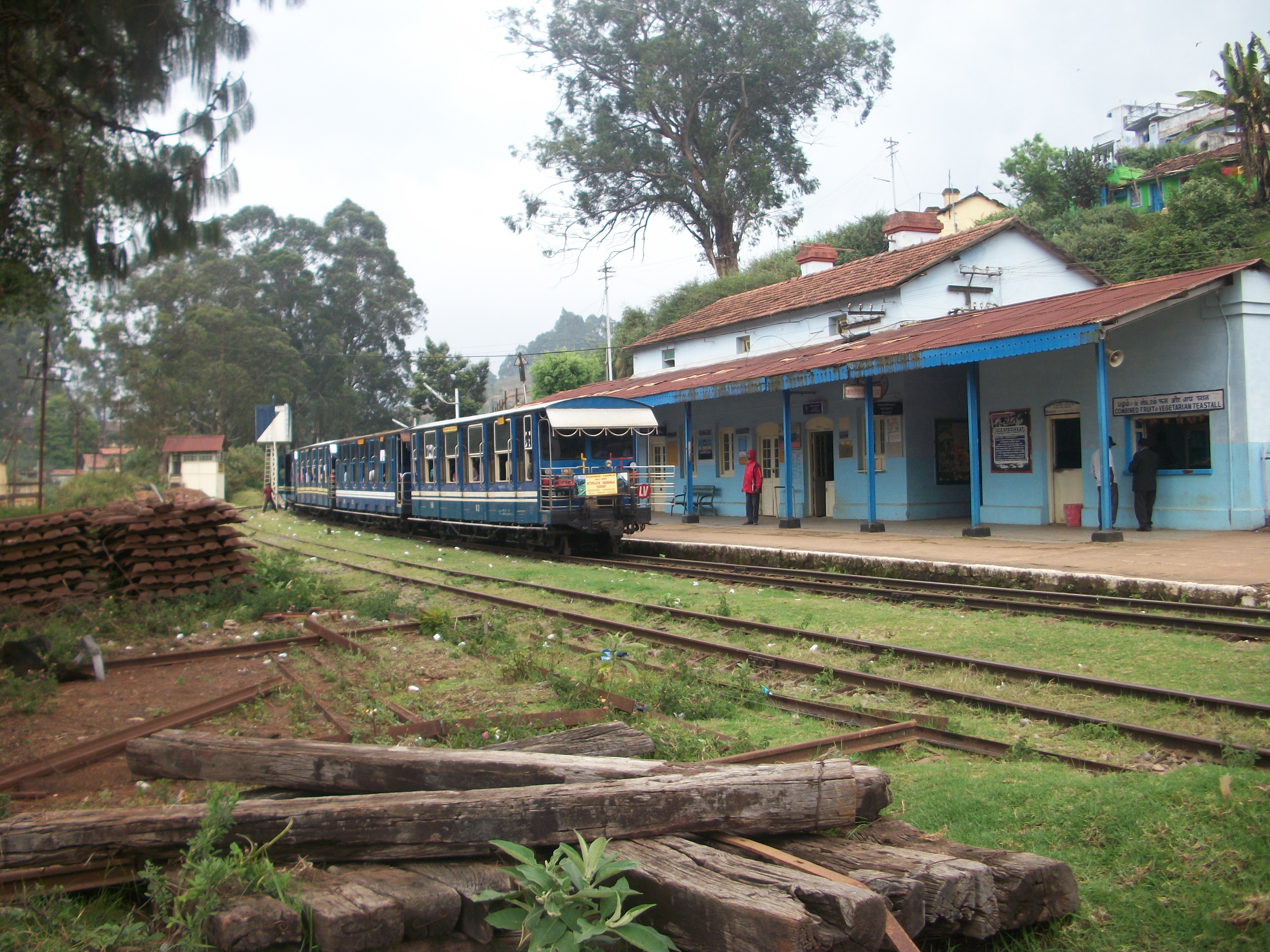
- Aruvankadu railway station

- Location in Tamil Nadu, India
- Coordinates: 11°21′2″N 76°46′29″E
- Country: India
- State: Tamil Nadu
- Region: Kongu Nadu
- District: The Nilgiris
- Elevation: 1,890 m (6,200 ft)

Languages
  - Official: Tamil
- Time zone: UTC+5:30 (IST)
- PIN: 643202
- Telephone code: 0423
- Vehicle registration: TN 43
- Nearest town: Coonoor
- Lok Sabha constituency: Nilgiris
- Vidhan Sabha constituency: Coonoor
- Temperature from Batchmates.com

Aruvankadu is a big village located in The Nilgiris District, Tamil Nadu, India. It is located between Coonoor and Ooty on the NH 67, 6 km from Coonoor town and 12 km from Ooty. It is connected by frequent bus services from various towns and cities. Aruvankadu is also connected via the Nigiri Mountain Railway (NMR).

== Industry ==
It houses the cordite factory, one of the 40 Indian Ordnance Factories. It is one of the oldest defence factories coming under the Ministry of Defence and the Indian Ordnance Factories. The cordite factory was established in 1903 by the then British Government on a huge campus and it still caters to the Defence Services by manufacturing cordite, an antiquated type of smokeless propellant, which is used in manufacturing small arms ammunition and also as a propellant in various tanks.

It is surrounded by small villages such as Balaji Nagar, Kara Korai, Jagathala, Othanatty, and Hosatty.

There are four schools (Kendriya Vidyalaya, Defence Employees Matriculation School, Cordite Factory Higher Secondary School and St. Anns Convent and Girls Higher Secondary School). There is also an apprentice college affiliated to the cordite factory.

The main sources of income for the local residents include employment at the Cordite factory, cultivation of Nilgiri tea and vegetables.

== Notable people ==
British astronomer and physicist Robert Hanbury Brown, developer of the intensity interferometer and discoverer of the Hanbury Brown and Twiss effect, was born in this place, where he lived until 8 years old.
