= Hot spot effect in subatomic physics =

Hot spots in subatomic physics are regions of high energy density or temperature in hadronic or nuclear matter.

== Finite size effects ==
Hot spots are a manifestation of the finite size of the system: in subatomic physics this refers both to atomic nuclei, which consist of nucleons, as well as to nucleons themselves, which are made of quarks and gluons, Other manifestations of finite sizes of these systems are seen in scattering of electrons on nuclei and nucleons. For nuclei in particular finite size effects manifest themselves also in the isomeric shift and isotopic shift.

== Statistical methods in subatomic physics ==
The formation of hot spots assumes the establishment of local equilibrium, which in its turn occurs if the thermal conductivity in the medium is sufficiently small. The notions of equilibrium and heat are statistical. The use of statistical methods assumes a large number of degrees of freedom. In macroscopic physics this number usually refers to the number of atoms or molecules, while in nuclear and particle physics it refers to the energy level density.

== Hot spots in nucleons ==
Local equilibrium is the precursor of global equilibrium and the hot spot effect can be used to determine how fast, if at all, the transition from local to global equilibrium takes place. That this transition does not always happen follows from the fact that the duration of a strong interaction reaction is quite short (of the order of 10^{−22}–10^{−23} seconds) and the propagation of "heat", i.e. of the excitation, through the finite sized body of the system takes a finite time, which is determined by the thermal conductivity of the matter the system is made of. Indications of the transition between local and global equilibrium in strong interaction particle physics started to emerge in the 1960s and early 1970s. In high-energy strong interactions equilibrium is usually not complete. In these reactions, with the increase of laboratory energy one observes that the transverse momenta of produced particles have a tail, which deviates from the single exponential Boltzmann spectrum, characteristic for global equilibrium. The slope or the effective temperature of this transverse momentum tail increases with increasing energy. These large transverse momenta were interpreted as being due to particles, which "leak" out before equilibrium is reached. Similar observations had been made in nuclear reactions and were also attributed to pre-equilibrium effects. This interpretation suggested that the equilibrium is neither instantaneous, nor global, but rather local in space and time. By predicting a specific asymmetry in peripheral high-energy hadron reactions based on the hot spot effect Richard M. Weiner proposed a direct test of this hypothesis as well as of the assumption that the heat conductivity in hadronic matter is relatively small. The theoretical analysis of the hot spot effect in terms of propagation of heat was performed in Ref.

In high-energy hadron reactions one distinguishes peripheral reactions with low multiplicity and central collisions with high multiplicity. Peripheral reactions are also characterized by the existence of a leading particle which retains a large proportion of the incoming energy. By taking the notion of peripheral literally Ref.2 suggested that in this kind of reaction the surface of the colliding hadrons is locally excited giving rise to a hot spot, which is de-excited by two processes: 1) emission of particles into the vacuum 2) propagation of “heat” into the body of the target (projectile) wherefrom it is eventually also emitted through particle production. Particles produced in process 1) will have higher energies than those due to process 2), because in the latter process the excitation energy is in part degraded. This gives rise to an asymmetry with respect to the leading particle, which should be detectable in an experimental event by event analysis. This effect was confirmed by Jacques Goldberg in K− p→ K− p π+ π− reactions at 14 GEV/c. This experiment represents the first observation of local equilibrium in hadronic interactions, allowing in principle a quantitative determination of heat conductivity in hadronic matter along the lines of Ref.3. This observation came as a surprise, because, although the electron proton scattering experiments had shown beyond any doubt that the nucleon had a finite size, it was a-priori not clear whether this size was sufficiently big for the hot spot effect to be observable, i. e. whether heat conductivity in hadronic matters was sufficiently small. Experiment4 suggests that this is the case.

=== Hot spots in nuclei ===
In atomic nuclei, because of their larger dimensions as compared with nucleons, statistical and thermodynamical concepts have been used already in the 1930s. Hans Bethe had suggested that propagation of heat in nuclear matter could be studied in central collisions and Sin-Itiro Tomonaga had calculated the corresponding heat conductivity. The interest in this phenomenon was resurrected in the 1970s by the work of Weiner and Weström who established the link between the hot spot model and the pre-equilibrium approach used in low-energy heavy-ion reactions. Experimentally the hot spot model in nuclear reactions was confirmed in a series of investigations some of which of rather sophisticated nature including polarization measurements of protons and gamma rays. Subsequently on the theoretical side the link between hot spots and limiting fragmentation and transparency in high-energy heavy ion reactions was analyzed and “drifting hot spots” for central collisions were studied. With the advent of heavy ion accelerators experimental studies of hot spots in nuclear matter became a subject of current interest and a series of special meetings was dedicated to the topic of local equilibrium in strong interactions. The phenomena of hot spots, heat conduction and preequilibrium play also an important part in high-energy heavy ion reactions and in the search for the phase transition to quark matter.

== Hot spots and solitons ==
Solitary waves (solitons) are a possible physical mechanism for the creation of hot spots in nuclear interactions. Solitons are a solution of the hydrodynamic equations characterized by a stable localized high density region and small spatial volume. They were predicted to appear in low-energy heavy ion collisions at velocities of the projectile slightly exceeding the velocity of sound (E/A ~ 10-20 MeV; here E is the incoming energy and A the atomic number). Possible evidence for this phenomenon is provided by the experimental observation that the linear momentum transfer in 12C induced heavy-ion reactions is limited.
