= QSO B2005+403 =

Quasar in the constellation of Cygnus

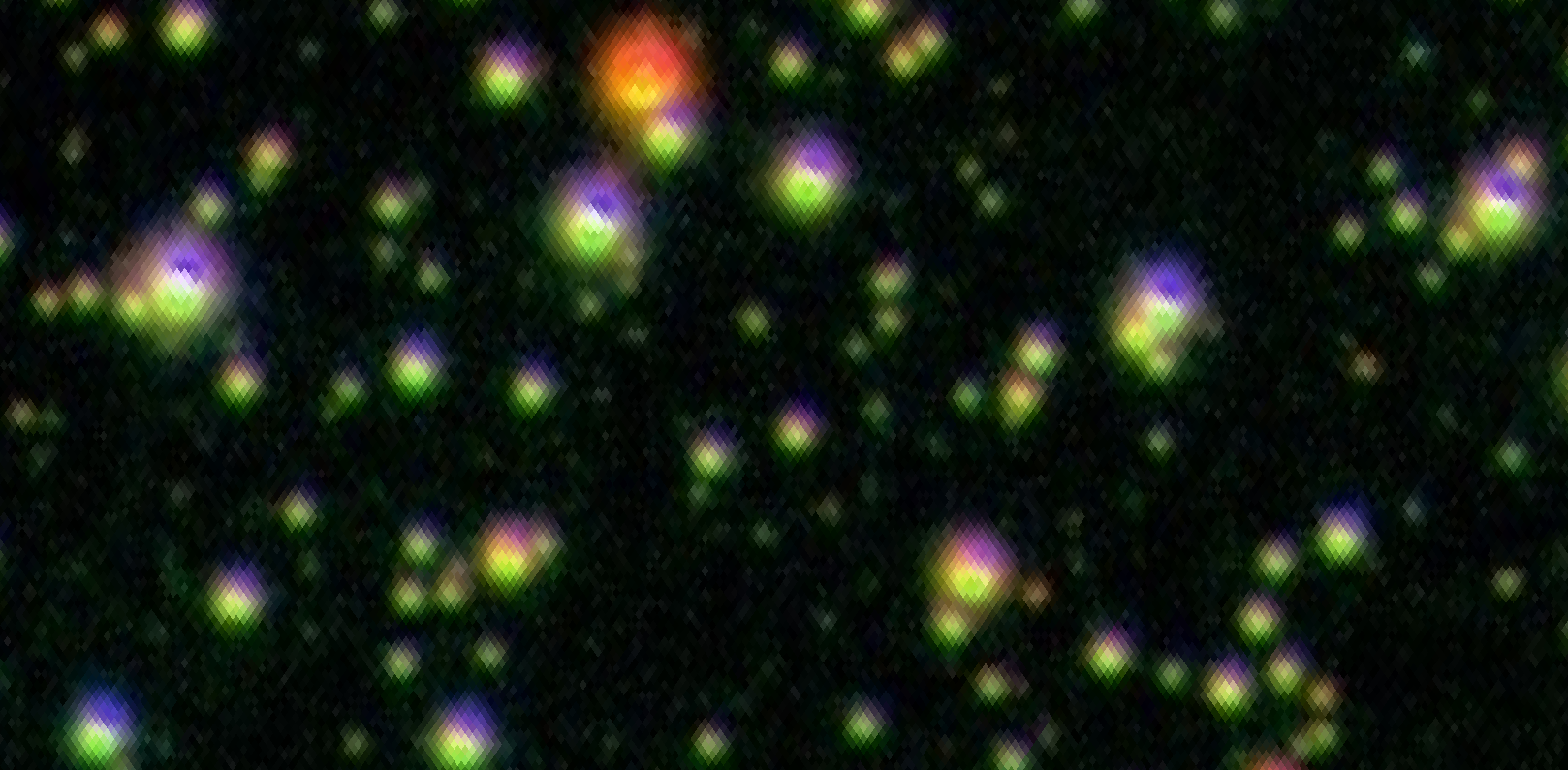
- SDSS image of QSO B2005+403.

Observation data (J2000.0 epoch)
- Constellation: Cygnus
- Right ascension: 20^{h} 07^{m} 44.94^{s}
- Declination: +40° 29′ 48.60″
- Redshift: 1.736000
- Heliocentric radial velocity: 520,440 km/s
- Distance: 9.677 Gly
- Apparent magnitude (V): 19.00
- Apparent magnitude (B): 18.5

Characteristics
- Type: Opt.var. LPQ RLQ

Other designations
- TXS 2005+403, NVSS J200744+402948, IERS B2005+403, VERA B2005+403, ZOAG G076.82+04.30, JVAS J2007+4029, MASIV J2007+4029

QSO B2005+403 is a quasar located in the constellation of Cygnus. The redshift of the object is (z) 1.736 and was discovered as a variable astronomical radio source in 1972, located near Cygnus A and later identified with a quasi-stellar object in 1976. The radio spectrum of the source is flat, thus it is classified as a flat-spectrum radio quasar.

== Description ==
QSO B2005+403 is described as variable. Observations in November 1972, noted the object's radio spectrum is slightly inverted, with it reaching 1.7 ± 0.1 Jy at 11.1 centimeters and 2.2 ± 0.2 Jy at 3.7 centimeters. The flux density of the source reached the highest level of 6.3 Jy on June 18 and 19 in 1973, before decreasing to 4.9 Jy and slightly increasing to 5.3 Jy in September, suggestive of an outburst. It brightened in November 1973, increasing to 18.5 magnitude.

The source of QSO B2005+403 is compact. Imaging observations above 8 GHz with Very Long Baseline Interferometry have showed the source has a core-jet structure oriented east to west. In the central region of 1 milliarcsecond lie three components, C1, C2 and C3, which display a relative alignment seeming to vary, with a slight bend towards north. There is also a faint partially resolved diffused radio emission region. There is a jet in QSO B2005+402, displaying a noticeable bend about 2 milliarcseconds from the nucleus with a bright feature moving closer by 0.1 milliarcsecond over a three year period observation, interpreted as a new emerging component. The jet components are moving on a non-ballistic trajectory reaching velocities ranging from 6.3-16.8 c, with the inner part of the jet pointed in a south east direction, based on 15 GHz radio mapping.

The quasar shows a parsec-scale rotation measure. Observations have shown the core has a rotation measurement of 668 ± 58 rad m^{−2} while the jet, on the other hand, has a rotation measurement of -200 ± 57 rad m-2. The radio core itself is inverted, with the location fit of the rotation measurement by 1.5 milliarcseconds east of it, also displays an inverted spectrum, however, it is optically thin at 15 GHz frequency.

QSO B2005+403 has evidence of anisotropic scattering, making it the second known quasar to have it after QSO 2023+335, in lower frequencies. The scattering patterns viewed by imaging of its core are extended along the 40° position angle at various frequencies and epochs, corresponding to a Galactic latitude line. The core of the quasar also shows an angular separation between itself and a secondary image, following a wavelength squared dependence, hinting at scattering of the interstellar medium. In light curve data presented for the quasar, it was found to undergo a distinctive extreme scattering event with detected flux variations of 10 percent, lasting for six months.
