= Roger Clifton Jennison =

British astronomer

Roger Clifton Jennison (18 December 1922 – 29 December 2006) worked as a radio astronomer at Jodrell Bank under the guidance of Robert Hanbury Brown. Jennison made a number of discoveries in the field of radio astronomy, including the discovery of the double nature of radio source Cygnus A (3C 405.0) with M K Das Gupta and the mapping of Cassiopeia A with V Latham.

== Early life ==
Jennison was born in Grimsby, England, in 1922. His education was at Clee Grammar School for Boys. He was commissioned from RAF aircrew to the Technical Branch-Signals, where he developed radar and microwave systems using the magnetron.

== Radio astronomy ==
In the 1950s he developed a new observable for obtaining information about visibility phases in an interferometer when delay errors are present called the closure phase. He performed the first measurements of closure phase at optical wavelengths. Jennison saw greater potential for his technique in radio interferometry, and proposed that it should be tested on a three-element radio interferometer at Jodrell Bank. In 1958 he successfully demonstrated its effectiveness at radio wavelengths, but it only became widely used for long baseline radio interferometry in 1974. A minimum of three antennas are required. This method was used for the first VLBI measurements, and a modified form of this approach ("Self-Calibration") is still used today at radio, optical and infrared wavelengths.

== Academic career ==
Jennison was appointed to the University of Kent at Canterbury in 1965 and was the first professor of physical electronics at the university. Within a year he established the Electronics Laboratory (later Department of Electronics and now School of Engineering and Digital Arts) at the university. Prior to his appointment at Kent, he was senior lecturer in radio astronomy at Jodrell Bank Observatory and senior lecturer in physics, Manchester University.

His research interests extended to relativity, studying paths of light in rotating systems, and also to studying water divining and ball lightning. With the latter, Jennison reported his personal encounter with the phenomenon as an airline passenger during a flight in March 1963, when a glowing ball of light was created inside the aircraft following a lightning strike. After retirement he was appointed as the emeritus professor of physical electronics at the University of Kent. He died on 29 December 2006.

The building which he helped design to house the Electronics Laboratory, now the seat of the School of Engineering and Digital Arts, was named after him by the University of Kent in 2009.

== Interest in the arts ==
Jennison was a co-founder of the Canterbury Society of Art and was involved in the activities of the Canterbury Arts Council. He was also a fellow of the Royal Astronomical Society, the Institution of Electrical Engineers and the Royal Society of Arts.

Roger Clifton Jennison's interest in the arts may have been stimulated by his father, George Robert Jennison, who was a well-known portrait painter in his home town of Grimsby and whose work is still on display in Grimsby Town Hall.
