= Eddington Medal =

Royal Astronomical Society award for research in theoretical astrophysics

- Website: http://www.ras.org.uk/awards-and-grants/awards/2263-eddington-medal

The Eddington Medal is awarded by the Royal Astronomical Society for investigations of outstanding merit in theoretical astrophysics. It is named after Sir Arthur Eddington. First awarded in 1953, the frequency of the prize has varied over the years, at times being every one, two or three years. Since 2013 it has been awarded annually.

== Recipients ==
Year	Name(s)
1953	Georges Lemaître
1955	Hendrik C. van de Hulst
1958	Horace W. Babcock
1959	James Stanley Hey
1960	Robert d'Escourt Atkinson
1961	Hans Albrecht Bethe
1962	André Lallemand
1963	J. A. R. Sandage, Martin Schwarzschild
1964	Herbert Friedman, Richard Tousey
1965	Robert Pound, Glen A. Rebka
1966	Rupert Wildt
1967	Robert F. Christy
1968	Robert Hanbury Brown, Richard Q. Twiss
1969	Antony Hewish
1970	Chūshirō Hayashi
1971	Desmond George King-Hele
1972	Paul Ledoux
1975	Stephen Hawking, Roger Penrose
1978	William A. Fowler
1981	Philip James Edwin Peebles
1984	Donald Lynden-Bell
1987	Bohdan Paczyński
1990	Icko Iben
1993	Leon Mestel
1996	Alan Guth
1999	Roger Blandford
2002	Douglas O. Gough
2005	Rudolph Kippenhahn
2007	Igor D. Novikov
2009	Jim Pringle
2011	Gilles Chabrier
2013	James Binney
2014	Andrew King
2015	Rashid Sunyaev
2016	Anthony Bell
2017	Cathie Clarke
2018	Claudia Maraston
2019	Bernard F. Schutz
2020	Steven Balbus
2021	Hiranya Peiris
2022	Alan Heavens
2023	Monika Mościbrodzka
2024	Pedro Ferreira
2025	Douglas C. Heggie
2026	Debora Šijački

== See also ==
- List of astronomy awards
- List of physics awards
- List of prizes named after people
