= Icko Iben =

American astronomer (1931–2025)

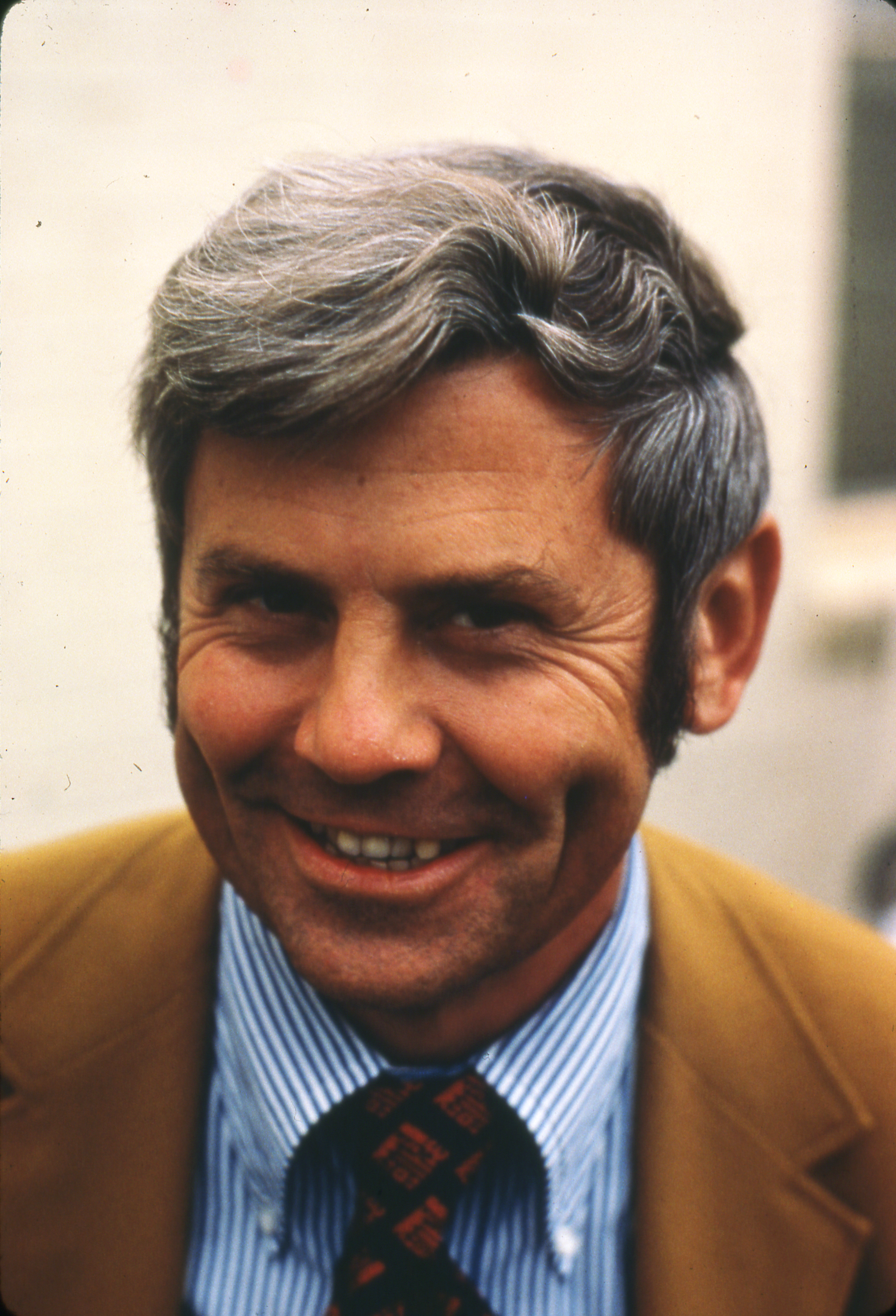
Iben in 1973

Icko Iben, Jr. (June 27, 1931 – June 11, 2025) was an American astronomer and a Distinguished Professor at the University of Illinois at Urbana-Champaign. He received his PhD from the University of Illinois in 1958 with thesis Higher order effects in beta decay, which was jointly supervised by John David Jackson and Joseph Weneser. Iben served on the MIT Physics Department faculty for some time before moving to Illinois, being promoted to associate professor in 1964. He is best known for his contributions to theoretical star models, stellar evolution theory, concerning the production of planetary nebulae, red giant heavy element convection, and modelling of asymptotic branch thermal pulses.

Iben was elected to the National Academy of Sciences in 1985. He was awarded the Henry Norris Russell Lectureship in 1989 and the Eddington Medal in 1990. He was the author of the two-volume work Stellar evolution physics (2012–2013).

Iben died on June 11, 2025, at the age of 93.
