= Claudia Maraston =

Astrophysicist

- Education: University of Bologna
- Scientific career
- Workplaces: University of Portsmouth; LMU Munich; Max Planck Institute for Extraterrestrial Physics

Claudia Maraston is a Professor of Astrophysics at the University of Portsmouth. She designs models for the calculation of spectro-photometric evolution of stellar populations. She is the winner of the 2018 Royal Astronomical Society Eddington Medal.

== Education and early career ==
Maraston completed her postdoctoral studies at the University of Bologna in 1998. She was a postdoctoral fellow at LMU Munich as well as the Max Planck Institute for Extraterrestrial Physics. In 2005, she was awarded a Marie Curie Fellowship, which allowed her to join the University of Oxford.

== Research ==
She won a Marie Curie Excellence Team Grant in 2005. In 2007, she was awarded a €1.4 million European Commission grant for UNIMASS. UNIMASS looked at how stellar population models informed galaxy formation. Maraston is interested in calculating the physical properties of galaxies (age, mass, history, epoch of formation) from observational data and galaxy formation simulation. Her Stellar Population Models are available for the public. She looks to calculate how much dark matter is present in a galaxy. She establishes the galaxy photometric redshifts (k-) and their corrections (e). She has studied single and composite stellar populations.

She has been part of several large grants from the Science and Technology Facilities Council. She was the architect of the SDSS-III/ Baryon Oscillation Spectroscopic Survey (BOSS) project. In 2016, she used this to calculate stellar masses for 400,000 luminous galaxies. BOSS is part of the Sloan Digital Sky Survey, and is designed to measure the baryon acoustic oscillations. They use her stellar population models. She modelled the UV spectrum of the SDSS-III/ Baryon Oscillation Spectroscopic Survey galaxies. In January 2018 she was awarded the Royal Astronomical Society Eddington Medal for her investigations into theoretical astrophysics. She is the second woman to win the award since it began in 1953.

Maraston is a popular science communicator, and has taken part in Café Scientifique and written for popular science magazine Astronomy Now. She serves on the editorial board of the journal the Monthly Notices of the Royal Astronomical Society.
