= Monika Mościbrodzka =

Polish astrophysicist

- Education: Nicolaus Copernicus Astronomical Center of the Polish Academy of Sciences
- Awards: Eddington Medal (2023); Athena Prize (2022)
- Scientific career
- Workplaces: Radboud University Nijmegen; University of Nevada, Las Vegas; University of Illinois Urbana-Champaign
- Website: www.astro.ru.nl/~monikamo/

Monika Mościbrodzka (pronounced: [mɔɕt͡ɕiˈbrɔt͡ska]) is a Polish astrophysicist who is a professor at Radboud University Nijmegen. She is an expert in general relativistic plasma dynamics and numerical astrophysics. She was part of the Event Horizon Telescope team who contributed to the first direct image of a black hole, supermassive black hole M87*. She was awarded the 2022 Dutch Research Council Athena Prize and the 2023 Eddington Medal of the Royal Astronomical Society.

== Early life and education ==
Mościbrodzka earned her doctorate at the Nicolaus Copernicus Astronomical Center of the Polish Academy of Sciences. Afterwards, she moved to the United States, where she was part of the University of Nevada and University of Illinois Urbana-Champaign.

== Research and career ==
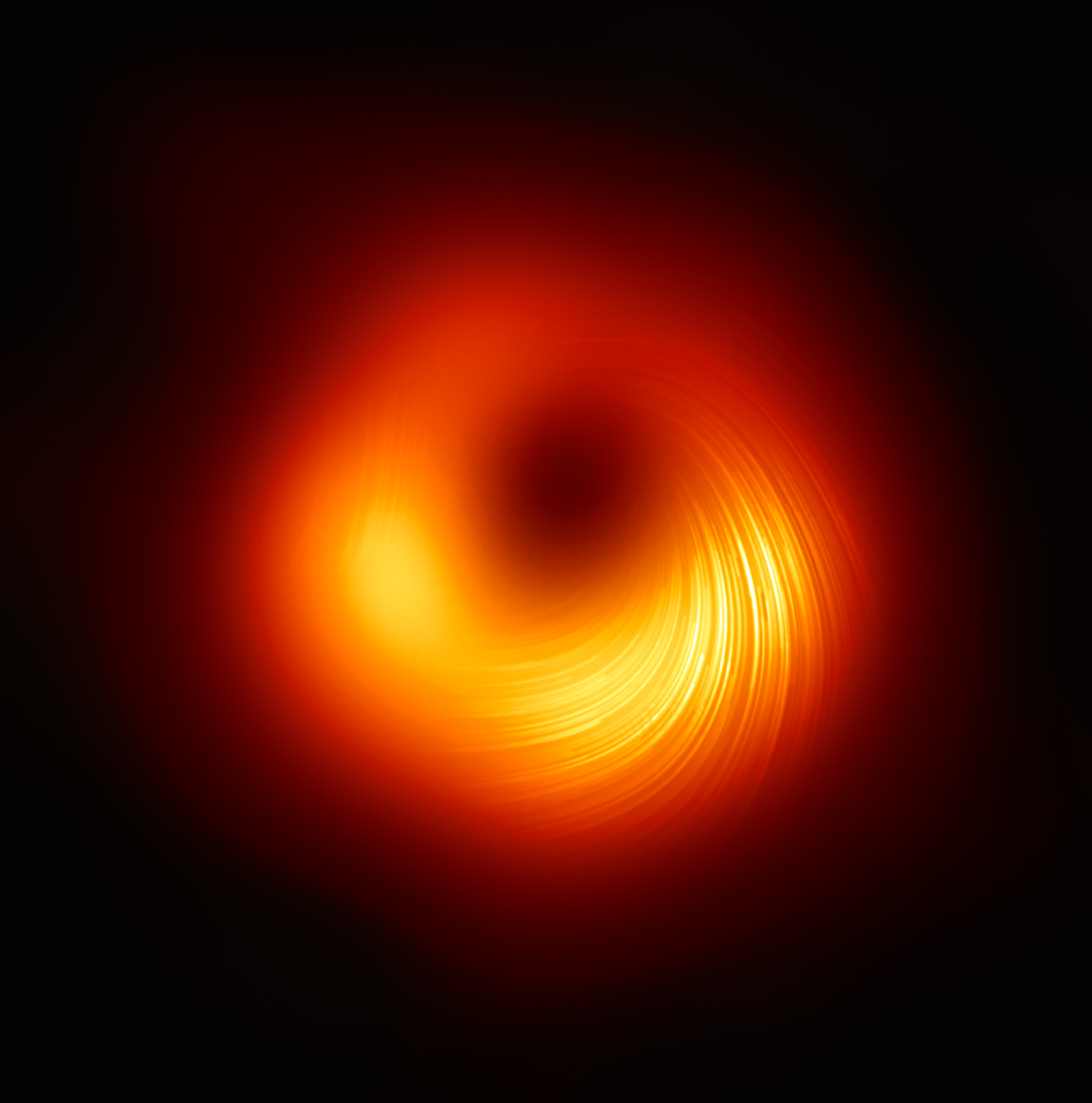
A view of the M87 supermassive black hole in polarised light

Mościbrodzka has pioneered the development of numerical astrophysics, which can be used in combination with experimental observations to test general relativity. These studies contributed to the first ever direct image of a black hole, specifically, the supermassive black hole at the centre of Messier 87. Mościbrodzka served as coordinator of the Event Horizon Telescope Polarimetric Working Group and performed polarization analysis of the M87 images. In these polarization-resolved images, the lines mark the direction of the oscillations of the electric vector of the electromagnetic waves.

Mościbrodzka also develops models of the accretion flows in the jets of black holes. By simulating the plasma, magnetic field dynamics and radiative transfer, Mościbrodzka can predict the signatures of accreting black holes.

== Awards ==
- 2019 Bloomberg 50
- 2022 Dutch Research Council Athena Award
- 2023 Eddington Medal

== Selected publications ==
- Monika Mościbrodzka; Charles F. Gammie; Joshua C. Dolence; Hotaka Shiokawa; Po Kin Leung (2 November 2009). "Radiative models of Sgr A* from GRMHD simulations". The Astrophysical Journal. 706 (1): 497–507. arXiv:0909.5431. Bibcode:2009ApJ...706..497M. doi:10.1088/0004-637x/706/1/497. ISSN 0004-637X. Wikidata Q60366912.
- Monika Mościbrodzka; Heino Falcke; Hotaka Shiokawa (22 January 2016). "General relativistic magnetohydrodynamical simulations of the jet in M 87". Astronomy & Astrophysics. 586: 38–38. arXiv:1510.07243. Bibcode:2016A&A...586A..38M. doi:10.1051/0004-6361/201526630. ISSN 0004-6361. Wikidata Q63380228.
- Monika Mościbrodzka; Heino Falcke; Hotaka Shiokawa; Charles F. Gammie (October 2014). "Observational appearance of inefficient accretion flows and jets in 3D GRMHD simulations: Application to Sagittarius A*". Astronomy & Astrophysics. 570: 7–7. arXiv:1408.4743. Bibcode:2014A&A...570A...7M. doi:10.1051/0004-6361/201424358. ISSN 0004-6361. Wikidata Q59974238.
