= Richard M. Weiner =

German physicist

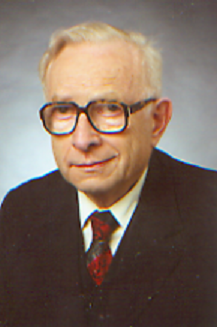
- Born: February 6, 1930; Cernăuți, Kingdom of Romania
- Died: August 13, 2020 (aged 90); Marburg, Germany
- Citizenship: Romanian, German
- Education: University of Bucharest
- Known for: Isomeric shift Bose–Einstein correlations
- Scientific career
- Fields: Nuclear physics, Theoretical physics
- Workplaces: Institute of Physics of the Romanian Academy of Sciences; CERN
- Thesis: (1958)

Richard M. Weiner (6 February 1930 – 13 August 2020) was a professor of theoretical physics at the University of Marburg in Marburg, Germany and an associate of the Laboratoire de Physique Théorique at Paris-Sud University in Orsay, France.

== Biography ==
Weiner was born 1930 in Cernăuți, Kingdom of Romania (presently Chernivtsi, Ukraine). He was a survivor of the Chernivtsi ghetto during World War II. He then moved to Bucharest, where he studied physics at the University of Bucharest. In a paper from 1956, he predicted the phenomenon of isomeric shift, his calculations showing that it should be measurable by atomic spectroscopy. Weiner got his PhD in Physics at the University of Bucharest in 1958, and from 1951 to 1968 he worked as a research scientist at the Physics Institute of the Romanian Academy of Sciences. Because of his intention to leave the Romanian communist regime, he was retrograded and denied an exit visa, being one of the first refuseniks of Central and Eastern Europe. His 1969 flight from communist Romania and joining CERN in Geneva made headlines in the media.

== Work ==
Richard Weiner predicted the isomeric shift which has found wide applications in many fields of physics. He also predicted the hot spot effect in subatomic physics and has made contributions to the theory of Bose–Einstein correlations being also the author of the only textbook on Bose–Einstein correlations. He was the initiator and co-organizer of the series of meetings LESIP. He also published a book titled Analogies in Physics and Life, A scientific Autobiography.

He supervised Ph.D. theses by Norbert Stelte, Michael Plümer, Udo Ornik, Fernando Navara, Bernhard Schlei, and Nelly Arbex, and had as postdoctoral collaborators among others Sibaji Raha, Apostolos Vourdas, Fred Pottag, and Leonid Razumov.

Weiner had over 180 publications in scientific journals and books. He also published a science-fiction novel in German, Das Miniatom-Projekt. He was asked for interviews, among others by the Frankfurter Rundschau and was invited by Hessischer Rundfunk within the series Doppelkopf dedicated to renowned personalities.

== Books authored ==
- R. M. Weiner (2000). Introduction to Bose–Einstein Correlations and Subatomic Interferometry. John Wiley & Sons. ISBN 0471969222.
- Richard M. Weiner (2006). Das Miniatom-Projekt. LiteraturWissenschaft.de. ISBN 3-936134-14-6.
- R. M. Weiner (2008). Analogies in Physics and Life, A Scientific Autobiography. World Scientific. doi:10.1142/6350. ISBN 978-981-270-470-2.
- R. M. Weiner (2010). The Miniatom Project. CreateSpace. ISBN 978-1451501728.
- Richard M. Weiner (2014). Aufstand der Denkcomputer. Verlag LiteraturWissenschaft. ISBN 978-3-936134-41-4.
- Richard. M. Weiner (2016). Rise of the Thinking Computers: A science fantasy. CreateSpace Independent Publishing Platform. ISBN 9781535095761.

== Books edited ==
- D. Scott; R. M. Weiner (1985). Local Equilibrium in Strong Interaction Physics, LESIP I. World Scientific. ISBN 9971-978-06-7.
- M. Plümer; S. Raha; R. M. Weiner (1990). Correlations and Multiparticle Production-CAMP, LESIP IV. World Scientific. ISBN 981-02-0331-4.
- R. M. Weiner (1997). Bose–Einstein Correlations in Particle and Nuclear Physics, A Collection of Reprints. John Wiley & Sons. ISBN 0-471-96979-6.
