= Andrew King (astrophysicist) =

British astrophysicist (born 1947)

Andrew Robert King
- Born: 19 February 1947 (age 79)
- Education: University of Cambridge
- Awards: Eddington Medal (2013)
- Scientific career
- Fields: Astrophysics
- Workplaces: University of Leicester; University College London; University of Hamburg
- Doctoral advisor: George Ellis

Andrew Robert King (born 19 February 1947) is a British astrophysicist and Emeritus Professor of Astrophysics in the School of Physics and Astronomy at the University of Leicester. His previous institutions have been University College London and the Institute for Theoretical Physics at the University of Hamburg. He has held visiting positions at the Observatoire de Paris, the Astronomical Institute of the University of Amsterdam, as well as being a visiting professor at Leiden University. He has served as Editor and Deputy Editor-in-Chief of the international astronomy journal Monthly Notices of the Royal Astronomical Society.

His research started with his PhD in relativistic cosmology, working with his supervisor George F. R. Ellis at the University of Cambridge. He also worked with Stephen Hawking. He has worked in the fields of general relativity, binary star evolution, accretion discs and active galactic nuclei.

In 2014 he received the Eddington Medal of the Royal Astronomical Society "for investigations of outstanding merit in theoretical astrophysics".

== Selected publications ==
Books

- Frank, Juhan; Andrew King; Derek Raine (2002) [1985]. Accretion Power in Astrophysics (3rd ed.). Cambridge University Press. ISBN 978-0-521-62957-7.
- Pringle, James E.; Andrew King (2007). Astrophysical Flows. Cambridge University Press. ISBN 978-1-139-46444-4.
- King, Andrew (2012). Stars: A Very Short Introduction. Oxford University Press. ISBN 978-0-19-163384-3.

Papers

- King, A. R.; Ellis, G. F. R. (1973). "Tilted homogeneous cosmological models". Communications in Mathematical Physics. 31 (3): 209–242. Bibcode:1973CMaPh..31..209K. doi:10.1007/BF01646266. ISSN 0010-3616. S2CID 120680577.
- King, A. R. (1988). "The Evolution of Compact Binaries". Quarterly Journal of the Royal Astronomical Society. 29: 1–25. Bibcode:1988QJRAS..29....1K.
- King, A. R.; Davies, M. B.; Ward, M. J.; Fabbiano, G.; Elvis, M. (2001). "Ultraluminous X-Ray Sources in External Galaxies". The Astrophysical Journal Letters. 552 (2): L109. arXiv:astro-ph/0104333. Bibcode:2001ApJ...552L.109K. doi:10.1086/320343. hdl:2381/749. ISSN 1538-4357. S2CID 17364247.
- King, Andrew (2003). "Black Holes, Galaxy Formation, and the MBH-σ Relation". The Astrophysical Journal Letters. 596 (1): L27–L29. arXiv:astro-ph/0308342. Bibcode:2003ApJ...596L..27K. doi:10.1086/379143. ISSN 1538-4357. S2CID 9507887.
- King, A. R.; Pringle, J. E. (2006). "Growing supermassive black holes by chaotic accretion". Monthly Notices of the Royal Astronomical Society: Letters. 373 (1): L90–L92. arXiv:astro-ph/0609598. Bibcode:2006MNRAS.373L..90K. doi:10.1111/j.1745-3933.2006.00249.x. ISSN 1745-3925. S2CID 14909546.
- King, A. R.; Pringle, J. E.; Hofmann, J. A. (2008). "The evolution of black hole mass and spin in active galactic nuclei". Monthly Notices of the Royal Astronomical Society. 385 (3): 1621–1627. arXiv:0801.1564. Bibcode:2008MNRAS.385.1621K. doi:10.1111/j.1365-2966.2008.12943.x. ISSN 0035-8711. S2CID 17182427.
- King, Andrew; Pounds, Ken (2015). "Powerful Outflows and Feedback from Active Galactic Nuclei". Annual Review of Astronomy and Astrophysics. 53 (1): 115–154. arXiv:1503.05206. Bibcode:2015ARA&A..53..115K. doi:10.1146/annurev-astro-082214-122316. S2CID 118494522.
