= Rebecca/Eureka transponding radar =

World War II airborne radio transponder system

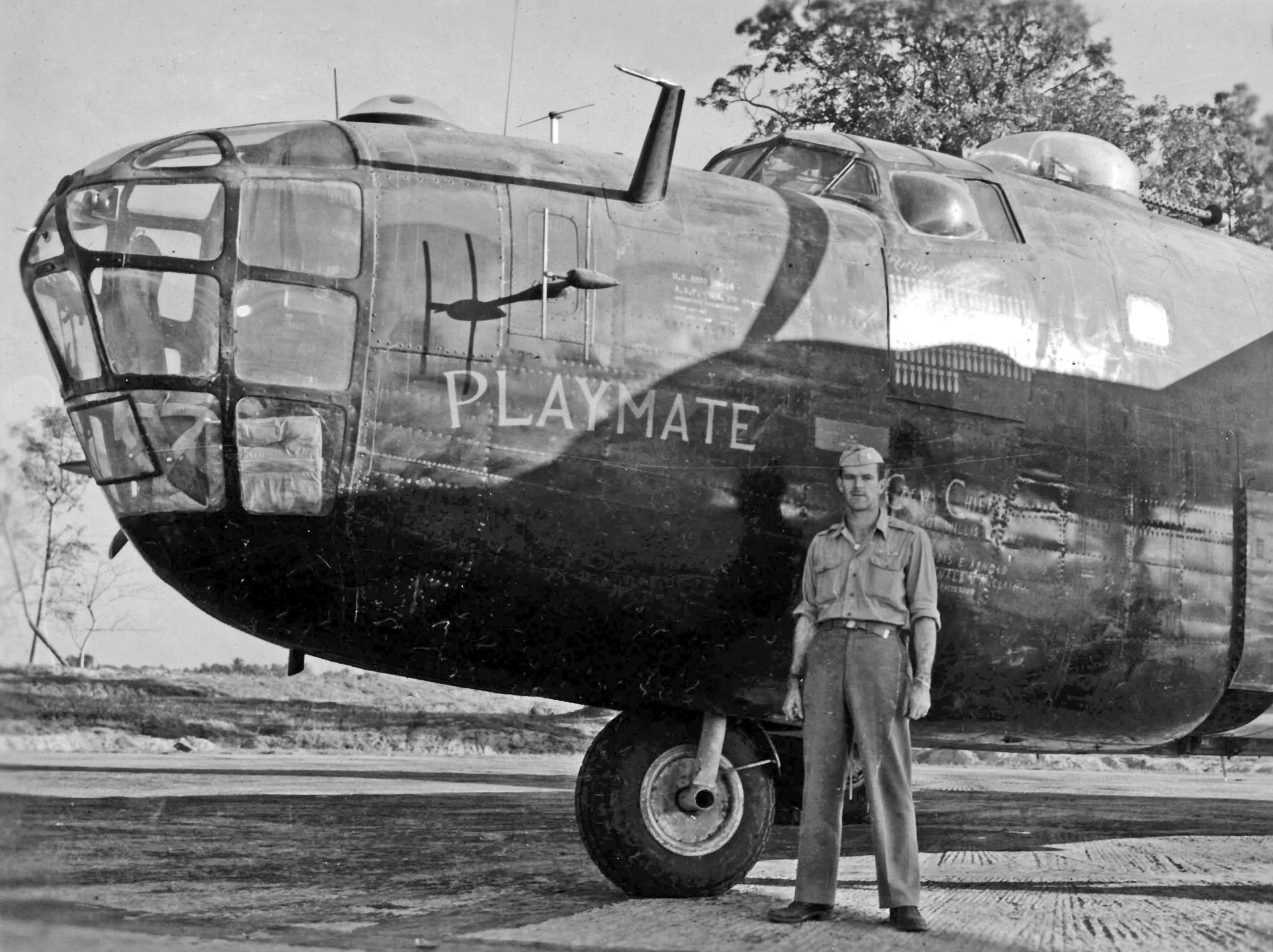
Sgt. William T. Alexander, flight engineer, with B-24D#42-63980 of the 858th BS, 801st/492nd BG "Carpetbaggers" in 1944, showing Yagi antenna for Rebecca transceiver

The Rebecca/Eureka transponding radar was a short-range radio navigation system used for the dropping of airborne forces and their supplies. It consisted of two parts, the Rebecca airborne transceiver and antenna system, and the Eureka ground-based transponder. Rebecca calculated the range to the Eureka based on the timing of the return signals, and its relative position using a highly directional antenna. The 'Rebecca' name comes from the phrase "Recognition of beacons". The 'Eureka' name comes from the Greek word meaning "I have found it!".

The system was developed in the UK at the Telecommunications Research Establishment by Robert Hanbury Brown and John William Sutton Pringle. Rebecca was essentially an ASV radar fit to a new broadcaster unit, while the Eureka system was all-new. Initial production began in 1943, and the system was used for dropping supplies to resistance fighters in occupied Europe, after delivery of the portable Eureka unit. The US Army Air Force started production in the US as well, and both examples could be used interchangeably. Over time, the Rebecca/Eureka found a number of other uses, including blind-bombing, airfield approach, and as a blind-landing aid in the BABS (Beam Approach Beacon Signal) form.

As many of the war-era systems used similar display units, the Lucero system was introduced to send the proper signals to interrogate any of these systems, allowing a single display unit of any type to be used for H2S, ASV, AI, Rebecca and BABS.

== History ==
=== Lucky accident ===
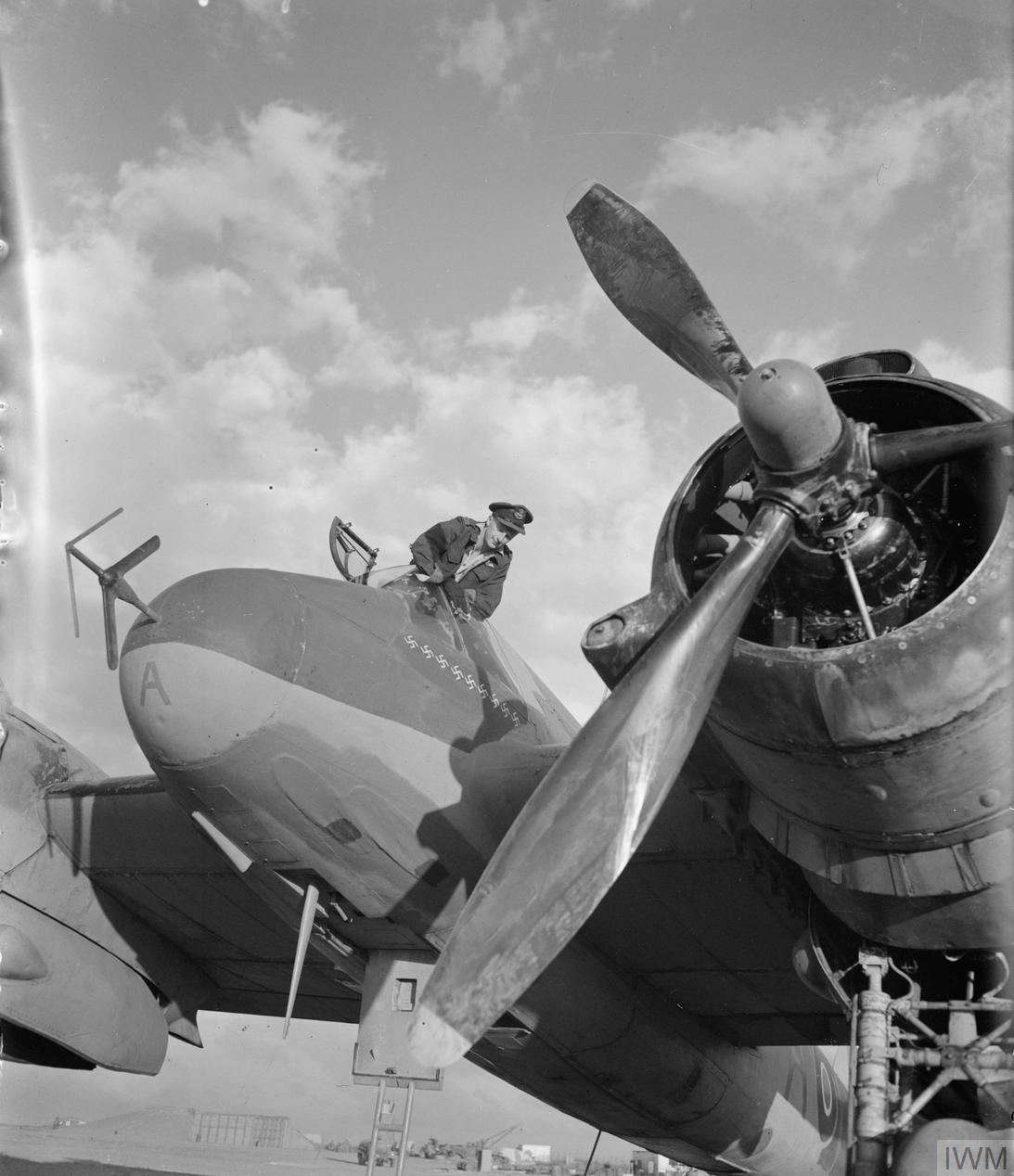
Mk. IV-equipped Bristol Beaufighter

Rebecca/Eureka owes its existence largely to the efforts of Robert Hanbury Brown, an astronomer and physicist who worked with the Air Ministry's AMES group on the development of radar. During 1940, Brown had led development of a new version of the AI Mk. IV radar that included a pilot's indicator, better known today as a C-scope. This display directly represented the relative position between the fighter and its target, as if the pilot were looking through a gunsight. It was hoped that this would greatly ease the problems that the radar operators had trying to relay instructions from their instruments to the pilot, especially at closer range.

Prototype sets became available in late 1940, with the first production examples arriving in January 1941. During a test flight in February, the aircraft was flying at 20,000 feet (6.1 km) when Hanbury Brown's oxygen supply failed and he passed out. The test pilot, Peter Chamberlain, realized what had happened and quickly landed the plane. Brown awoke in an ambulance. This accident, along with the many previous flights at high altitude, aggravated an ear injury he had received at RAF Martlesham Heath in 1939, and during the spring he was hospitalized for a mastoidectomy operation in Brighton. The operation was successful, but a post-operation infection caused him to go deaf in both ears and several follow-up visits were required.

By the time he returned to the AMES research center, now in Worth Matravers and renamed the Telecommunications Research Establishment (TRE), major research on the early AI sets had ended in favour of new systems working at microwave frequencies using the recently invented cavity magnetron. Brown had missed most of the development of this system, and he was no longer allowed to fly at high altitudes, so his work on AI ended. He was instead placed in a new group led by John Pringle, a zoologist from Cambridge University, and the two began to study new applications for radar technologies.

=== Beacons for Army Co-operation ===
In June 1941, Brown visited the Army headquarters at Old Sarum Airfield to see if the RAF Army Co-operation Command's School of Army Co-operation might put radar to good use. The Army Co-operation squadrons carried out a variety of missions including artillery spotting, general reconnaissance, and ground attack. He found the group was only mildly interested in radar, thinking it might make a useful device for warning of the approach of enemy fighters, but were perfectly happy using flags and smoke signals for navigation and communications. Brown then visited a military exercise involving ground attacks in close coordination with the Army, and was convinced that radar systems could be used to improve these results. However, he also came to realize that almost all such missions would be carried out by aircraft of other forces, notably the RAF, so any system they proposed would have to be mounted in those aircraft.

Pringle then arranged for Brown and himself to meet with the Commander in Chief (C-in-C) for Army Co-operation, Sir Arthur Barratt. In a long conversation, the two outlined the possibilities of radar for bombing, navigation and return-to-base roles, all of which proved to be interesting to Barratt. Barratt then stated that any system they did adopt would have to fit in single seat aircraft like the Tomahawk, which eliminated most of these possibilities. Both Pringle and Brown then focused on the use of a transponder system combined with existing radars to allow accurate bombing or delivery of supplies or troops by parachute, a role that would almost always be carried out by twin-engine aircraft or larger. If this broadcast on the 200 MHz frequency then being used by many British radars, any aircraft with aircraft interception (AI) or air-to-surface-vessel (ASV) radar could pick it up.

To illustrate the concept, Brown gave them a small transponder and told them to hide it anywhere within 15 miles (24 km) of Army Co-operation headquarters in Bracknell. One of the TRE aircraft from RAF Christchurch would attempt to find it and fire a smoke signal within 100 yards (91 m) of its location. The test was carried out on 28 July 1941, and while they waited for their aircraft to arrive, another aircraft approached the hiding spot and flew around several times before flying off again. The Army suspected that they had sent this aircraft to spy out the location. Just as Brown managed to convince them they were not spies, their own aircraft, a Bristol Blenheim, arrived and fired a smoke signal only 50 yards from the transponder. To be sure, the Army was told to hide it again in another location, this time choosing to place under a tree on the lawn of their headquarters. Their Blenheim once again easily found it. It was later learned that the first aircraft was from the Fighter Interception Unit who saw the odd blip on their radar and decided to investigate.

In spite of the successful demonstrations, and enthusiastic support from Barratt and others, no orders for a transponder system were immediately forthcoming. A visit to the airborne headquarters at RAF Ringway would ultimately result in orders for both the UK and US, but those would be some time in the making.

=== SOE ===
A more immediate outcome of the visit to Ringway was an invitation for Brown to meet a secret group known as the Special Operations Executive (SOE) at Whitehall. Brown arrived to find this was not actually their office, and had to prove his identity before being told the real address was quite a distance away. When he finally arrived at Baker Street he was not impressed.

SOE then explained the problem they were having dropping supplies to partisans operating across Europe, as far away as Poland. Brown explained that their beacon could be seen as far as 50 miles (80 km) under good conditions, but that might drop to as short as 5 miles if it was under trees or otherwise blocked. SOE stated that they could be reasonably certain to place it on open ground. However, they also stated that they could only navigate to perhaps ten miles of the beacon, which would be only marginally satisfactory. Brown asked why they could not use the Gee navigation system to address this, and when they admitted they had no idea what this was, he had the satisfaction of saying he could not explain it to them because it was secret.

Ultimately, Brown was taken to meet the C-in-C of the SOE and arranged a demonstration similar to the one given earlier for the Army. SOE was given the transponder and told to hide it anywhere within a large area, and their aircraft would not attempt to find it until a week later. On 11 February 1942 one of the TRE's Avro Ansons took off from RAF Hurn and picked it up at a range of 37 miles (60 km), approaching and dropping two containers within 200 yards. An order was placed immediately.

=== Prototypes ===
One of the major problems with the original AI radars was that the transmissions spread out over the entire front hemisphere of the aircraft. Shorter wavelengths, like those used in AI, tended to scatter from the ground, sending a portion of the signal back towards the aircraft, the "ground reflection" or "ground return". For the simple reason that the ground is much larger than a target aircraft, the scattered signal overwhelmed any target return, and made it impossible to see any target further away than the aircraft's current altitude. For the supply mission, which was carried out at very low altitudes, this was clearly not going to work.

As the SOE had their own aircraft, and there was no need to make the system work with an existing production radar design, the solution was relatively simple. Instead of the transponder replying on the same frequency, and thus being lost in the ground reflections, it would receive the signal from the radar and then re-broadcast it on a second frequency. In the aircraft, the receiver would be tuned not to the radar's broadcasts, but the transponder's. This way the ground reflection would simply be ignored, although at the cost of requiring the transponder to have two separate antenna systems.

Powering the transponder was a more serious problem. The system had to operate in any weather, which made conventional lead-acid batteries unsuitable due to their poor cold-weather performance. The system also had to be stored for long periods of time before being activated, which again argued against lead-acid. The solution was found to be small nickel-iron batteries that could be repeatedly and rapidly recharged in the field, and operated across a wide range of temperatures. To protect the system from capture, it was fitted with small explosives that would destroy enough of the circuitry to make it impossible to determine the exact frequencies being used. The transponders were mounted in suitcases, selected on a case-by-case basis to match common types in use in that area.

Superregenerative receivers formed the “Eureka” portion of the Rebecca–Eureka radar navigation system and related interrogation-response arrangements. These systems assisted aircraft in locating ground beacons during airborne operations, including those conducted during the Second World War.

A dozen transponders were supplied to the SOE in 1942, at which point the TRE's involvement largely ended. Brown later learned that these were used extensively throughout the war. One example, dropped in Norway, was used on seven separate drops, in spite of being buried for the better part of a year in a biscuit tin.

=== Airborne use ===
The Airborne Forces Equipment Committee took up development of the system in the summer of 1942, funding low-priority development of a Mark II system intended for use on glider tugs and paratroop aircraft. At the time, it was decided that each Eureka should be able to handle interrogation from up to 40 aircraft at a time. They also selected a design based on several sub-units that would allow the equipment to be changed simply by swapping sub-units from a common chassis.

Both Rebecca II and Eureka II were developed by Murphy Radio, with early pre-production of Rebecca II by Dynatron Radio. A system using a selection of tuned capacitors was used to select the operational frequency from a set of four. Looking for a controller, Murphy selected a General Post Office 5-position electromechanical system used in their telephone exchange systems. A similar selection of four channels was available in the Eureka units, but these were selected manually. Rebecca was powered off the aircraft mains, whilst Eureka was battery powered with a lifetime of about six hours.

In testing, Eureka II proved to be too heavy for practical use, so A.C. Cossor was selected to build a Mk III version. They used US miniature 9000-series tubes for this version and a much smaller battery with a three-hour life.

=== US use ===
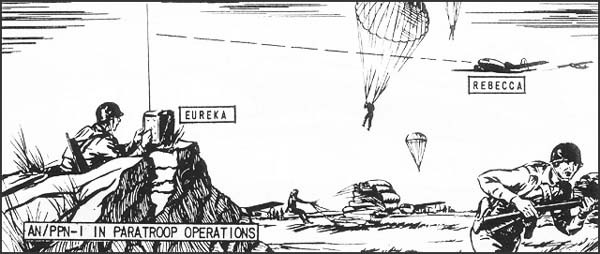
US Navy Rebecca/Eureka transponding radar training sketch

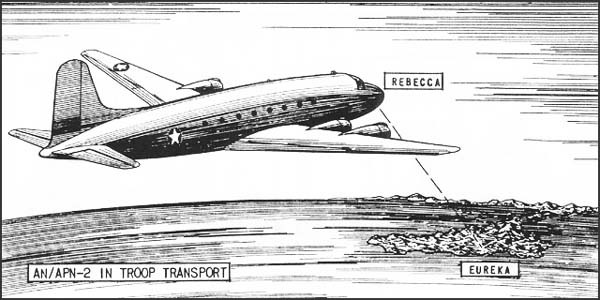
Airborne Long Wave Rebecca Responsor training sketch

In December 1942 Brown was flown to the US via Pan Am Clipper to meet with the US I Troop Carrier Command. They started production of a number of versions of the Mk. III as the AN/PPN-1 (Eureka), AN/PPN-2 (Portable Eureka) and AN/TPN-1 (Transportable Eureka). The AN/APN-2 (Rebecca), also known as the SCR-729, used a display that saw use for a number of purposes.

When many British military gliders failed to reach their landing zones in Sicily even in excellent conditions, a rushed effort to develop an even smaller and lighter Rebecca III system started. Cossor was again selected for the development, using a super-regenerative receiver and batteries for only 30 minutes of operation. The Rebecca IIIN version was used for strike aircraft in the Pacific theatre. These versions used capacitors in all five positions of the rotary switch.

The introduction of the miniature B7G tubes in 1944 led to a new round of development of the Rebecca/Eureka. Dozens of different variations were eventually developed.

== Description ==
The airborne Rebecca interrogator transmitted a 4-5 μs (microsecond) long pulse at a rate of 300 pulses per second on a frequency between 170 and 234 MHz. Upon receiving this signal, the Eureka rebroadcast the pulses on a different frequency. The Eureka unit also included a keying system that periodically lengthened the pulses over a period of seconds, allowing a morse code signal to be sent for station identification.

This rebroadcast signal was received by two directional yagi antennas on the aircraft carrying the Rebecca unit, the usual location for the aerials being on either side of the aircraft cockpit. The signal was then sent to a conventional ASV radar display, with the vertical axis measuring time (and thus distance) and the horizontal showing the strength of the signal. If the aircraft was approaching the Eureka from the side, the horizontal pulse would extend further on one side of the display than the other, indicating the need for the aircraft to turn toward the shorter blip in order to fly directly toward the Eureka.

There was a slight delay in the Eureka between signal reception and the return pulse. As the Rebecca units approached the Eureka the return signal would eventually overlap the interrogation pulse, and render the system ineffective. This occurred at a range of about two miles. At this time the crew had to switch to visual means of locating the drop zone. Reliance on Eureka without visual confirmation invariably resulted in premature drops, as during the American airborne landings in Normandy.

== Versions ==
There were many versions of the system. Early models were limited to a single frequency; later ones could switch between five frequencies.

=== British ===
Eureka Mk VII was a rack-mounted, non-mobile transponder used at RAF bases for aircraft to home onto.

A Mark X version of both Rebecca and Eureka that worked in the 1000 MHz range. This was developed for use during in-flight refueling, enabling the receiving aircraft to locate the tanker while maintaining radio silence. The tanker aircraft carried the Eureka and the receiving aircraft carried the Rebecca. This equipment was trialled by 214 Squadron in the early 1960s.

=== American ===
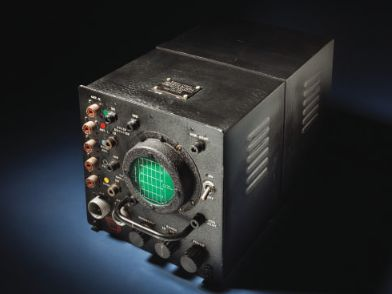
1943 Rebecca radar transceiver at the National Air and Space Museum

- AN/PPN-1
- AN/PPN-1A
- AN/PPN-2

The Rebecca code name was derived from the phrase "recognition of beacons".

== In popular culture ==
- Pathfinders - In The Company of Strangers is a 2011 movie based on Rebecca/Eureka transponding radar installed before D-Day by Airborne Pathfinders.

== See also ==
- Signal Corps Radio
- List of military electronics of the United States
