= Phyllis Mary Nicol =

Australian lecturer and demonstrator in physics

- Born: 2 March 1903; Thirroul, Australia
- Died: June 13, 1964 (aged 61); Sydney, Australia
- Education: North Sydney Girls High School, University of Sydney
- Employer: University of Sydney School of Physics

Phyllis Mary Nicol (2 March 1903 – 13 June 1964) was an Australian physics professor who taught at the University of Sydney's physics department.

== Life ==
Nicol was born in Wollongong's seaside suburb of Thirroul in 1903. She was the first child of Florence (Reeves) and Walter George Phillip Nicol, a bullocky. She attended North Sydney Girls High School, before studying physics at the University of Sydney, graduating in 1926.

She did research on the properties of selenium which was published in 1926.

She and a fellow demonstrator at the university, Edgar Booth wrote a textbook together about physics for high school students. Their book, Physics, Fundamental Laws and Principles with Problems and Worked Solutions was published in 1931. She was still living at the Women's College and in 1933 she became its sub-principal. She was known as Philly Nic and for being a spinster in a hurry and dressing without care. Conversely she told her students that they would gain confidence if they dressed smartly for examinations. Nicol was undervalued and overlooked. The leading cricketer Betty Archdale was the college's principal from 1946 and she also served on the university's senate.

Harry Messel joined the University of Sydney as Professor of physics in 1952 and in that year Nicol applied to be a senior lecturer. Her application was unsuccessful. All the department's staff designated as temporary had their grades assessed by a senate committee in 1953. Messel wrote well of Nicol's ability to coach students but he did not consider her a lecturer. In the same year she had a mastectomy. She left the Women's College in 1954, and her position as sub-principal, to move to the Sydney suburb of Lane Cove to live with her sister.

== Death and legacy ==
Nicol's physics 1931 book with Edgar Booth achieved its 16th edition in 1962. She died in her home in Lane Cove in 1964 of cancer. She had resigned from the department, that she had joined in 1921 as a student, a few days before her death.
