= James Stanley Hey =

English physicist and radio astronomer

Stanley Hey FRAS FRS MBE
- Hey, photographed in 1964; Copyright: QinetQ Limited
- Born: James Stanley Hey; 3 May 1909; Nelson, Lancashire, England
- Died: 27 February 2000 (aged 90)
- Education: University of Manchester
- Known for: Radio astronomy; Discovering that the Sun radiates radio waves
- Spouse: Edna Heywood
- Awards: Eddington Medal
- Scientific career
- Fields: Astronomy, physics
- Workplaces: Burnley Grammar School; Air Defence Research and Development Establishment

James Stanley Hey FRAS FRS MBE (3 May 1909 – 27 February 2000) was an English physicist and radio astronomer. With the targeted application of radar technology for astronomical research, he laid the basis for the development of radio astronomy. While working in Richmond Park during the Second World War, Hey discovered that the Sun radiates radio waves and localised for the first time an extragalactic radio source in the constellation Cygnus.

== Early life and education ==
He was born in 1909 in Nelson, Lancashire, the third son of a cotton manufacturer, which was the main industry in Lancashire. Hey studied physics at the University of Manchester, graduating in 1930, and obtained his master's degree in X-ray crystallography the next year as a student of Lawrence Bragg.

== Career ==
After graduating, Hey became a teacher, and taught physics at Burnley Grammar School for some years.

In 1940 Hey joined the Air Defence Research and Development Establishment's (ADRDE) Operational Research Group, later the Army Operational Research Group (AORG) after a six-week course at the Army Radio School. Hey was based at Petersham, Surrey, and later at Ibstock Place, Roehampton, Surrey. His main research site was nearby in Richmond Park. From February 1942 Hey's task was to work on radar anti-jamming methods; for a year German jamming of Allied radar had been a problem and the escape of three German warships through the English Channel, aided by enemy radar jamming from the French coast, had highlighted the problem. On 27 and 28 February 1942 Hey had reports from sites across Britain of severe noise jamming of anti-aircraft radars in the 4–8 m range. Realising that the direction of maximum interference seemed to follow the Sun, he checked with the Royal Observatory, Greenwich and found that a very active sunspot was traversing the solar disc. He concluded that a sunspot region, which was believed to emit streams of energetic ions and electrons in magnetic fields of around 100 G (gauss), could emit metre-wave radiation. This was the first discovery of a specific astronomical radio source. Later in 1942, G.C. Southworth in the USA also linked the Sun with radio noise, this time in the centimetre-wave region.

Later, in 1944–1945, Hey used radar to track the paths of V-2 rockets approaching London at about 100 miles high, aiming to be able to predict their point of impact. He noticed spasmodic transient radar echoes at heights of about 60 miles, arriving at a rate of five to 10 per hour. When the V-2 attacks ceased, the echoes did not; Hey concluded that meteor trails were responsible and that radar could be used to track meteor streams, and could of course do so by day as well as by night. When he tried to increase the sensitivity of his radar in order to track V-2s from a greater distance, he rediscovered the cosmic radio noise that Karl Jansky and Grote Reber had found in the 1930s.

Hey's results of 1942 and 1944 could not be published until after the war. From 1945 to 1947, Hey used AORG's radars in Richmond Park to research his wartime radio astronomical discoveries further. The Richmond Park installation thus effectively became the first radio observatory in Britain. Hey's main colleagues in this work were John Parsons (1918–1992), an electrical and mechanical engineer; Gordon Stewart (1919–2003), an electrical engineer; and James Phillips (1914–2003), a mathematician, who like Hey had been a schoolmaster before the war. In 1946 the Sun became active again, and the group confirmed sunspots and solar flares as the source of the emissions. In 1945 and 1946 they confirmed radar echoes from meteors, and derived methods to derive meteor shower radiants from the echoes, so discovering the first daytime meteor shower. In 1945 and 1946 they mapped the intensity of cosmic radio noise across the sky. In February 1946 they discovered a strong source in Cygnus which scintillated rapidly. Hey realised that the scintillation meant that the source must be compact, and suggested that it was a 'radio star'. It was later shown to be Cygnus A, a radio galaxy. This was, after Hey's discovery of the radio Sun, the first discovery of a specific astronomical radio source. During this period visitors to Hey at Richmond Park included Bernard Lovell, whom Hey helped to establish his radio observatory at the University of Manchester, and Jack Ratcliffe, under whom Martin Ryle and Antony Hewish established radio astronomy at Cambridge. Hey's observatory in Richmond Park was closed in 1947.

Hey became Head of the AORG in 1949. From 1952 he returned to ADRDE, which later became part of the Royal Radar Establishment at Malvern, Worcestershire, where he also continued his radio astronomical observations. At his observatory at Defford, Worcestershire, he built a variable-spacing radio interferometer, with which he briefly parallelled Martin Ryle's research at Cambridge. From 1966 until his retirement in 1969 Hey was head of the research department.

== Personal life ==
Brought up in a church-going Wesleyan Methodist family, Hey became an agnostic in his teenage years, and remained so for the rest of his life.

He met his wife, Edna Heywood, when they were both students at Manchester University. They married in 1934.

The couple moved to Eastbourne in 1969, following Stanley Hey's retirement. Edna died in September 1998, 12 years after having a severe stroke.

== Honours, awards and fellowships ==
- 1945 – MBE for operational research on Army radar
- 1947 – Fellow of the Royal Astronomical Society
- 1950 – DSc, University of Manchester, on the strength of Hey's 1940s radio astronomy research
- 1959 – Eddington Medal of the Royal Astronomical Society
- 1975 – Honorary Doctor of the University of Birmingham
- 1978 – Fellow of the Royal Society
- 1977 – Honorary Doctor of the University of Kent

== Legacy ==
- Asteroid 22473 Stanleyhey, discovered in 1997, is named in his honour.

== Works ==
- Hey, J. S. (1946). "Solar Radiations in the 4–6 Metre Radio Wave-Length Band". Nature. 157 (3976): 47–48. Bibcode:1946Natur.157...47H. doi:10.1038/157047b0. S2CID 4119848.
- Hey, J. S.; Stewart, G. S. (1946). "Derivation of Meteor Stream Radiants by Radio Reflexion Methods". Nature. 158 (4014): 481. Bibcode:1946Natur.158..481H. doi:10.1038/158481a0. S2CID 4120295.
- Hey, J. S.; Stewart, G. S. (1947). "Radar observations of meteors". Proceedings of the Physical Society. 59 (5): 858. Bibcode:1947PPS....59..858H. doi:10.1088/0959-5309/59/5/312.
- Hey, J. S.; Parsons, S. J.; Stewart, G. S. (1947). "Radio observations of the Giacobinid Meteor shower, 1946". Monthly Notices of the Royal Astronomical Society. 107 (2): 176–183. Bibcode:1947MNRAS.107..176H. doi:10.1093/mnras/107.2.176.
- Hey, J. S.; Parsons, S. J.; Phillips, J. W. (1948). "An investigation of galactic radiation in the radio spectrum", Proceedings of the Royal Society A, 192, 425–445

=== Popular science books ===
- Hey, J. S. (1971). The Radio Universe. Oxford: Pergamon Press, 256pp. ISBN 978-0080157412
- Hey, J. S. (1973). Evolution of Radio Astronomy. New York: Science History Publications. ISBN 978-0882020273
