= Blind Approach Beacon System =

Automatic radar landing system

A blind approach beacon system or beam approach beacon system (BABS) is an automatic radar landing system developed in the early 1940s.

It is a responder (or transponder) mounted in a Hillman van and placed at the end of the runway. In some cases fixed sites were installed and by the mid-1950s Standard 9 vans were in use. It was interrogated by a Rebecca unit mounted in an aircraft. It responded by transmitting dots on one side of the runway and dashes on the other. The strength of the reception in the aircraft depended on the aircraft's position relative to the centre line of the runway. The aircraft's equipment could then determine its position relative to these dots and dashes.

This is an early version of the localizer from the more modern instrument landing system (ILS). The localizer uses two tones (90 and 150Hz) modulated on a carrier (108.1-111.95 MHz) and transmitted on a wide aperture antenna array, this can be seen at almost all airports at the end of the runway. The strengths of which (or Difference in Depth of Modulation) are detected by electronics in the aircraft and present the pilot with an indication to fly left or right and indeed up or down with a co-located glidepath (328.6 to 335.4 MHz) equipment. See instrument landing system for further details.

== See also ==
- Precision approach radar
- Instrument approach
- Ground-controlled approach
