= John William Sutton Pringle =

British zoologist

Sir John William Sutton Pringle FRS (22 July 1912 – 2 November 1982) was a British zoologist. His research interests were in insect physiology, especially proprioception, flight muscle, and cicada song.

== Life and career ==
Pringle was born in 1912, and educated at Winchester College before going up to King's College, Cambridge where he took a first class degree in the Natural Sciences Tripos in 1934. He was appointed Demonstrator in Zoology at the University of Cambridge in 1937, and elected as a Fellow of King's College in 1938, a position he held until 1945; during the Second World War he served with the Telecommunications Research Establishment (TRE), where he and Robert Hanbury Brown invented the Rebecca/Eureka transponding radar. He was awarded an MBE and the American Medal of Freedom in 1945. That same year he returned to Cambridge as Lecturer in Zoology and Fellow of Peterhouse. In 1959 he was appointed Reader in Experimental Cytology. In 1961 he moved to the Linacre Chair of Zoology at Merton College, Oxford.

He was elected as a Fellow of the Royal Society in 1954.

In 1946 he married Beatrice Laura Wilson; they had a son and two daughters.
