= Cygnus A =

Radio galaxy

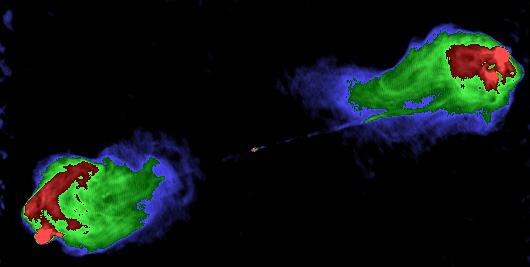
- False-color radio image at 5 GHz (VLA data)

Observation data (J2000 epoch)
- Constellation: Cygnus
- Right ascension: 19^{h} 59^{m} 28.3566^{s}
- Declination: +40° 44′ 02.096″
- Redshift: 0.056075 ± 0.000067
- Distance: 232 Mpc (760 million ly)
- Group or cluster: Cygnus-A-Cluster
- Apparent magnitude (V): 16.22

Characteristics
- Type: E
- Apparent size (V): 0.549' × 0.457'

Other designations
- 4C 40.40, 2E 4309, CYG A, W 57, BWE 1957+4035, NRAO 620, 1C 19.01, QSO B1957+405, 3C 405, 1RXS J195928.7+404405, 3C 405.0, 2U 1957+40, 3CR 405, LEDA 63932, 4U 1957+40, VV2000c J195928.3+404402, DA 500, MCG+07-41-003, DB 117, Mills 19+4, VV 72, PGC 63932.

Cygnus A (3C 405) is a radio galaxy, one of the strongest radio sources in the sky.

== Discovery and Identification ==
A concentrated radio source in Cygnus was discovered by Grote Reber in 1939. In 1946 Stanley Hey and his colleague James Phillips identified that the source scintillated rapidly, and must therefore be a compact object. In 1951, Cygnus A, along with Cassiopeia A, and Puppis A were the first "radio sources" identified with an optical instrument. Of these, Cygnus A became the first radio galaxy, the other two being nebulae inside the Milky Way. In 1953 Roger Jennison and M K Das Gupta showed it to be a double source. Like all radio galaxies, it contains an active galactic nucleus (AGN). The supermassive black hole at the core has a mass of (2.5±0.7)×10^{9} M_{☉}. Jets from the AGN have also been observed to induce hotspots in the radio lobes and subsequently holes in the surround Intergalactic medium (IGM).

Cygnus A is the cD galaxy in a rich galaxy cluster of the same name, and has been found to have quite a number of around 200 neighboring galaxies. It is also worth to note that the larger Cygnus galaxy cluster is undergoing a cluster merger, of which it is one of the first cluster mergers whose radial velocity (Doppler Shift) has been measured through X-ray spectroscopy.

== Jets and Hotspots ==
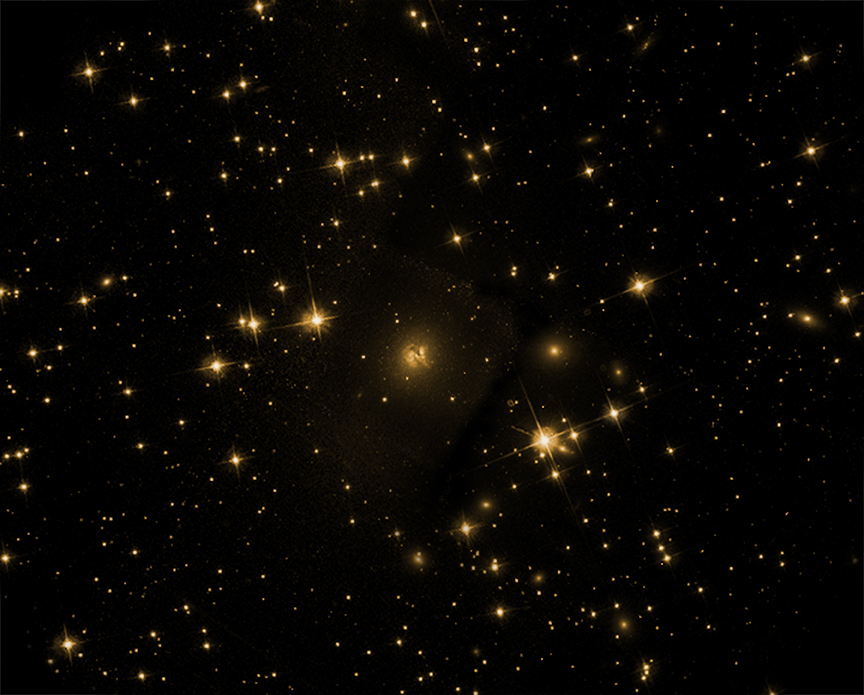
Optical image of Cygnus A contains a giant bubble (cloud in the center)

Images of the galaxy in the radio portion of the electromagnetic spectrum show two jets protruding in opposite directions from the galaxy's center. These jets extend many times the width of the portion of the host galaxy which emits radiation at visible wavelengths. At the ends of the jets are two lobes with "hot spots" of more intense radiation at their edges. These hot spots are formed when material from the jets collides with the surrounding intergalactic medium.

These hotspots interacting with the intergalactic medium, or intracluster medium (ICM), primarily observed in the radio spectrum can also be observed in the X-Ray range. Chandra's resolution in the X-Ray range gave the resolution and wavelength necessary to observe the hotspots in better detail, and they turned out to be cavity or hole like structures in both lobes. The cavities seen carved out at the hotspots of lobes are caused by the interaction between the jets, powered by the AGN of Cygnus A, and the intra-cluster-medium surrounding the galaxy. X-Ray jets thermally heat these hotspots, energizing them and pushing surrounding plasma out of the way carving a hole through the ICM. The most prominent cavity is seen in the eastern lobe (on the left) where the diameter of the hole is around 3900 parsecs, or around 11,700 lightyears wide, and the depth is 13.3 kiloparsecs, or 44,000 lightyears deep.

Although it has not been directly observed, Cygnus A's spectra suggest there is a dusty torus obscuring the AGN centered on the jet's axis. The torus has been observed to extend around 200 pc radially outwards from the center with an estimated height of 143 pc.

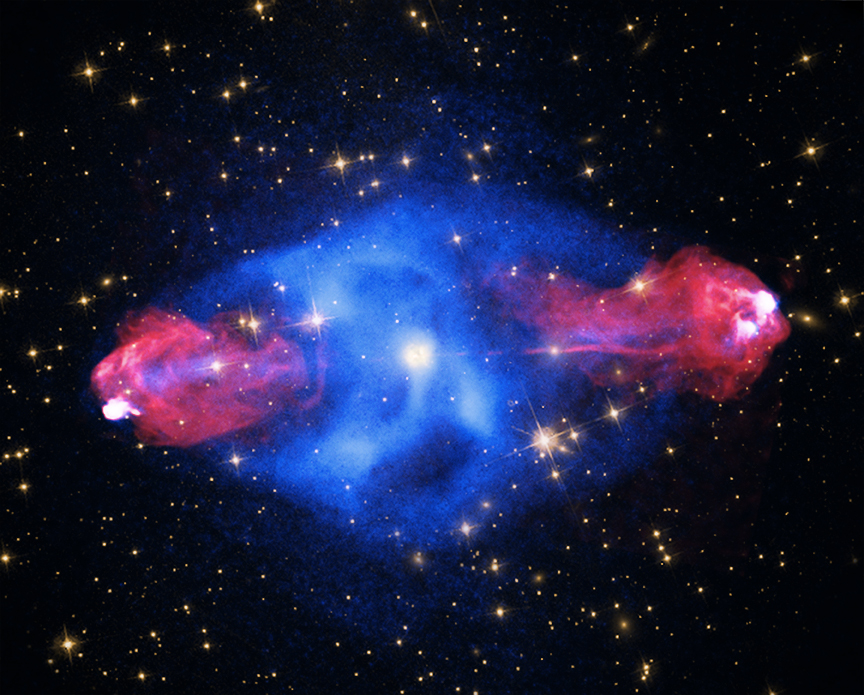
Cygnus A composite image of X-Ray light from Chandra Space Telescope (blue) and radio from NSF's Very Large Array (red). Notice the bright hotspots in the eastern and western lobes lit up in both red and blue.

== Second Black hole ==
In 2016, a radio transient was discovered 460 parsecs away from the center of Cygnus A. Between 1989 and 2016, the object, cospatial with a previously-known infrared source, exhibited at least an eightfold increase in radio flux density, with comparable luminosity to the brightest known supernova. Due to the lack of measurements in the intervening years, the rate of brightening is unknown, but the object has remained at a relatively constant flux density since its discovery. The data are consistent with a second supermassive black hole orbiting the primary object, with the secondary having undergone a rapid accretion rate increase. The inferred orbital timescale is of the same order as the activity of the primary source, suggesting the secondary may be perturbing the primary and causing the outflows.

== See also ==
- List of galaxies
- List of nearest galaxies
