= Debora Šijački =

Computational cosmologist

Debora Šijački is a computational cosmologist whose research involves computational methods for simulating the formation and development of the structures in the universe including galaxies, galaxy clusters, and dark matter, including collaborations in the Illustris project. Originally from Serbia, she was educated in Italy and Germany, and works in the UK as a professor at the University of Cambridge and deputy director of the Kavli Institute for Cosmology.

== Education and career ==
Šijački is originally from Belgrade, the daughter of Serbian physicist Đorđe Šijački, and grew up in Belgrade. She was an undergraduate at the University of Padua in Italy, and completed a Ph.D. at LMU Munich in Germany in 2007 for research performed at the Max Planck Institute for Astrophysics. Her dissertation, Non Gravitational Heating Mechanisms in Galaxy Clusters, was jointly supervised by Volker Springel and Simon White.

She came to the University of Cambridge from 2007 to 2010, as a postdoctoral researcher in the Institute of Astronomy. After continued postdoctoral research from 2010 to 2012 in the US at the Harvard–Smithsonian Center for Astrophysics, she returned to the Cambridge Institute of Astronomy in 2013 as a university lecturer. She became Reader in Astrophysics and Cosmology in 2016, and Professor of Astrophysics and Cosmology in 2021.

== Recognition ==
Šijački received the Otto Hahn Medal for her doctoral research. She was the 2019 recipient of the Ada Lovelace Award for High Performance Computing of the Partnership for Advanced Computing in Europe (PRACE), recognizing her "numerous high-impact results in astrophysics based on numerical simulations on state-of-the-art supercomputers".
