= Sulamith Goldhaber =

American high-energy physicist (1923–1965)

- שולמית גולדהבר
- Born: Sulamith Low; November 4, 1923; Vienna, Austria
- Died: December 11, 1965 (aged 42); Madras, India
- Education: M.Sc Hebrew University of Jerusalem in 1947, PhD. University of Wisconsin–Madison in 1951
- Spouse: Gerson Goldhaber
- Scientific career
- Fields: High-energy physics

Sulamith Goldhaber (Hebrew: שולמית גולדהבר; November 4, 1923 – December 11, 1965), née Low, was a high-energy physicist and molecular spectroscopist. Goldhaber was a world expert on the interactions of K^{+} mesons with nucleons and made numerous discoveries relating to it.

== Biography ==
Sulamith Low was born November 4, 1923, in Vienna, Austria. She grew up in Palestine after her family emigrated out of Austria. She attended Hebrew University of Jerusalem where she met her future husband, Gerson Goldhaber. She graduated with an M.Sc. in 1947, and was married to Gerson the same year. The Goldhabers moved to the United States to pursue doctorates at University of Wisconsin–Madison which they were awarded in 1951. The couple with their son Amos Nathaniel moved to Columbia University in New York City, where Gerson worked in the physics department, and Sulamith, despite her degree in physical chemistry, found work as an assistant to Jack Steinberger, working on what were then considered high energy experiments at the Nevis Laboratory of Columbia.

Goldhaber became a naturalized citizen of the United States in 1953. The Goldhabers moved to Berkeley, California, in 1953 when Gerson was given a job as an assistant professor at the University of California. While Goldhaber had previously worked in physical chemistry, she was able to transition to high energy physics and form a collaboration with her husband working on nuclear emulsion. The Goldhabers hoped to use their nuclear emulsion technique with the newly opened Bevatron—at the time the highest energy accelerator in operation—and it was through their methods that they observed some of the earliest interactions between K^{−} mesons and protons. Using the Bevatron and the nuclear emulsion technique Goldhaber was the first to observe mass splitting in charged E hyperons as well as the first nuclear interactions of the antiproton.

In the 1960s the Goldhabers realized that they should begin using the bubble chamber to continue their studies instead of nuclear emulsion so they formed the "Goldhaber–Trilling Group" with George Trilling. Goldhaber quickly became a renowned expert in hydrogen bubble chamber physics, accruing a lengthy list of invited papers and conference talks. The Goldhabers were the first to measure the spin of the K* meson and the first to study the simultaneous production of pairs of resonant states. They also invented the triangle diagram to aid in their research. Early in this period, the Goldhabers were both Ford Foundation fellows at CERN where they co-authored a CERN report together with B. Peters.

Goldhaber was in high demand as a speaker at scientific conferences due to her mastery of her field, and her ability to express herself beautifully. She gave a seminal talk on the production and interaction of heavy mesons and hyperons at the 1956 Rochester Conference that marked the transition from cosmic ray based experiments to particle accelerator base experiments in the study of strange particles. In the fall of 1965 the Goldhabers took a sabbatical to travel around the world visiting high energy laboratories and giving lectures. They first stopped at Oxford for the biennial European conference on high energy physics, and then CERN so that Goldhaber could discuss methods of making automatic film measurements with Berkeley's Hough-Powell device. The Goldhabers then traveled to Ankara to lecture, and spent a month at the Weizmann Institute in preparation for the lectures Sulamith was to give in Madras, India.

In Madras Goldhaber suffered a stroke. Exploratory surgery revealed a growing brain tumor. She died without having regained consciousness on December 11, 1965.

Goldhaber had one son with her husband named Amos. She was remembered by her friends and colleagues as "a distinguished scientist, a remarkable homemaker and hostess, and a devoted wife and mother".

== Awards and honors ==
- Sigma Xi member
- 1964–65 Guggenheim Fellowship
- 1960–61 Ford Foundation Fellow
