= Richard Q. Twiss =

Astronomer and physicist from United Kingdom

Richard Quintin Twiss (24 August 1920 – 20 May 2005) was a British astronomer. He is known for his work on the Hanbury Brown and Twiss effect with Robert Hanbury Brown. It led to the development of the Hanbury Brown-Twiss intensity interferometer in the UK in 1954. Their work appeared to contradict the established beliefs about quantum interference, and he and Brown received the Eddington Medal of the Royal Astronomical Society for it in 1968.

== Life ==
Richard Twiss was born in Simla in India but was educated in England. He read mathematics at Cambridge, completing the Mathematical Tripos with distinction, but his early contributions were to the theory of radar and basic electronics. His work in this area was included in the famous "five foot shelf"—a series of reference books in electronic engineering compiled at MIT that was the circuit designer's bible in the 1950s. He was awarded a Doctor of Science degree by MIT in 1949.

Twiss went on to help construct the Narrabri Stellar Intensity Interferometer. Observations with the interferometer began in 1965. Measurements made between 1965 and 1974 were used to establish the temperature scale for stars hotter than the Sun and this scale is still in use.

The intensity interferometer has a very poor signal-to-noise ratio compared to the classical "Michelson" stellar interferometer. Twiss decided to pursue the Michelson alternative at the National Physical Laboratory at Teddington in the UK. John Davis worked with him for a short while on this project.

When the Royal Observatory, Edinburgh established its outstation at Monte Porzio Catone just south of Rome, Twiss decided to move his Michelson interferometer there. Not only was the weather more conducive to astronomy, the food and wine were much superior to what was available in Teddington!

Speckle interferometry was discovered during that period by Antoine Labeyrie. This stimulated a renewed interest around the world in interferometry. In particular, John Davis and Hanbury Brown became convinced that a Michelson interferometer would be cheaper to build and have superior performance to a new intensity interferometer.

In the mid-1970s Twiss's non-scientific interests gradually took over and he effectively retired from active involvement in science.

In the 1970s he made it clear that he regarded Australia as a colonial backwater. His reaction when told that William J. Tango was going to join Davis and Brown in Sydney was typical. "But William," he said, "they eat peas out of tins!"

In spite of that, a few years before his death Twiss visited Australia and fell in love with it. In 2004 he applied for permanent residence. He died on 20 May 2005.

He is mentioned in the book "Boffin : A Personal Story of the Early Days of Radar, Radio Astronomy and Quantum Optics" ISBN 0-7503-0130-9, by Hanbury Brown

He was awarded the Albert A. Michelson Medal of the Franklin Institute in 1982, jointly with Robert Hanbury Brown.

== Twiss Parameters ==
In accelerator physics, a method of describing the properties of a beam has become known as Twiss Parameters. While this is a reference to Richard Twiss, it is unclear (including to Twiss himself) how his name became associated with the formulation, as the parameters were developed by Ernest Courant and Hartland Snyder, and are more accurately referred to as the Courant–Snyder parameters.
