= Cyril Hazard =

British astronomer and physicist (1928–2025)

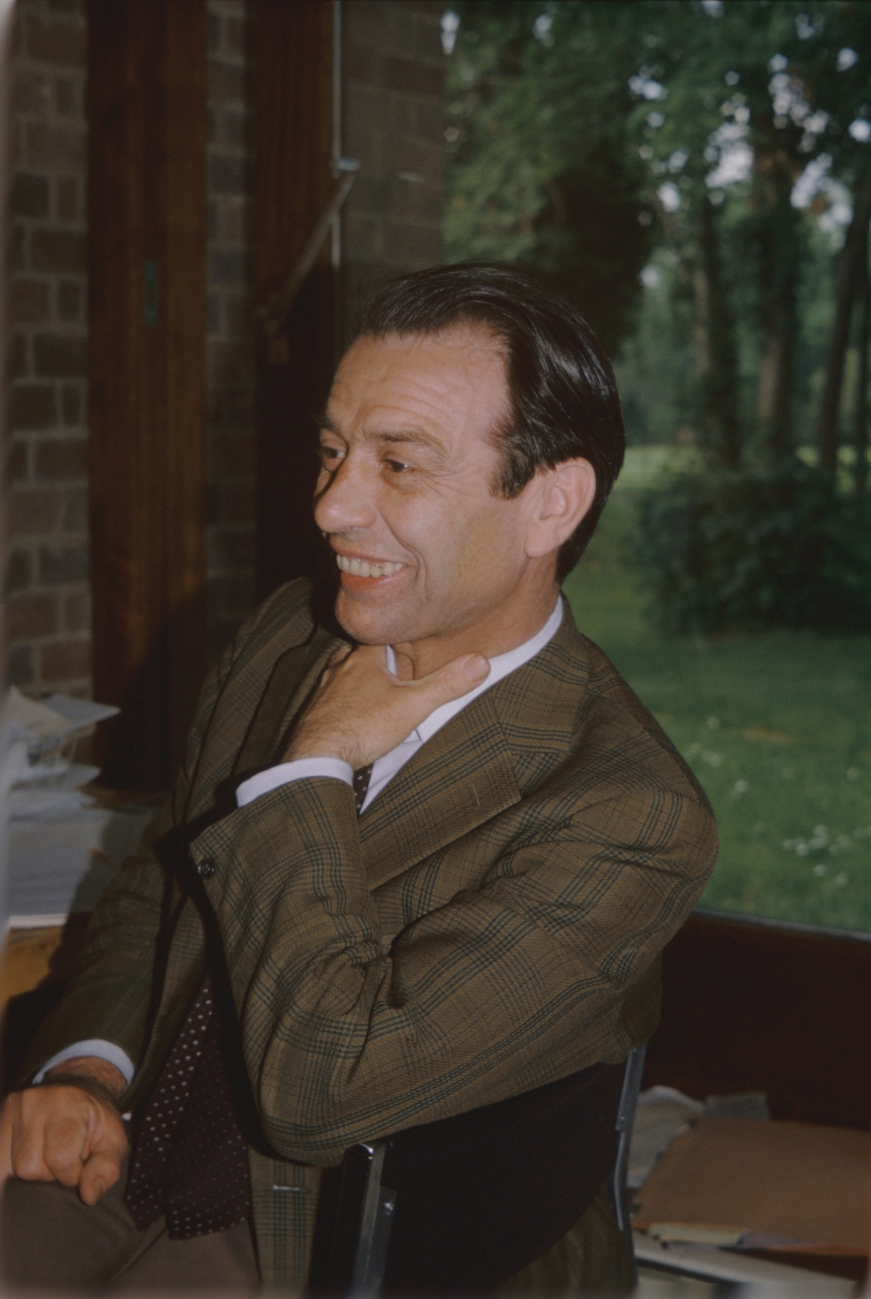
- Hazard in 1981
- Born: 18 March 1928; Cumbria, England
- Died: 14 June 2025 (aged 97); Melbourn, Cambridgeshire, England
- Education: University of Manchester
- Scientific career
- Fields: Astrophysics
- Doctoral advisor: Robert Hanbury Brown

Cyril Hazard (18 March 1928 – 14 June 2025) was a British astronomer. He is known for revolutionising quasar observation with John Bolton in 1962. His work allowed other astronomers to find redshifts from the emission lines from other radio sources.

== Early work ==
Cyril Hazard was born on 18 March 1928 in No.6, Flosh Cottages, Cleator, Cumberland. Cyril Hazard grew up in Cleator Moor, Cumberland.. He got his doctorate from the University of Manchester, studying under Sir Bernard Lovell and Robert Hanbury Brown. He worked first at Jodrell Bank.

In 1950, radio emission from the Andromeda Galaxy were detected by Robert Hanbury Brown and Hazard at the Jodrell Bank Observatory.

== The discovery of quasars ==
Two radio sources were involved 3C 48 and 3C 273. Radio measurements taken by Cyril Hazard and John Bolton during one of the occultations using the Parkes Radio Telescope allowed Maarten Schmidt to optically identify the object and obtain an optical spectrum using the 200-inch Hale Telescope on Mount Palomar. This spectrum revealed the same strange emission lines. Schmidt realized that these were actually spectral lines of hydrogen redshifted at the rate of 15.8 percent. This discovery showed that 3C 273 was receding at a rate of 47,000 km/s.

== The technique ==
As the source is occulting behind the moon ( viz. passing behind), Fresnel style diffraction patterns are produced which can be detected by very large radio telescopes and the exact locations calculated.

== Death and legacy ==
Hazard died at his home in Melbourn, Cambridgeshire, on 14 June 2025, at the age of 97.

The minor planet 9305 Hazard, discovered on 7 October 1986 by Ted Bowell, was named after him.

== Bibliography ==
- Hazard, C.; Mackey, M. B.; and Shimmeris, A. J. "Investigation of the radio Source 3C273 by the Method of Lunar Occultation." Nature 197, 1037, 1963.
