= Isomeric shift =

Atomic spectral line shift

The isomeric shift (also called isomer shift) is the shift on atomic spectral lines and gamma spectral lines, which occurs as a consequence of replacement of one nuclear isomer by another. It is usually called isomeric shift on atomic spectral lines and Mössbauer isomeric shift respectively. If the spectra also have hyperfine structure the shift refers to the center of gravity of the spectra. The isomeric shift provides important information about the nuclear structure and the physical, chemical or biological environment of atoms. More recently the effect has also been proposed as a tool in the search for the time variation of fundamental constants of nature.

== Isomeric shift on atomic spectral lines ==
The isomeric shift on atomic spectral lines is the energy or frequency shift in atomic spectra, which occurs when one replaces one nuclear isomer by another. The effect was predicted by Richard M. Weiner in 1956, whose calculations showed that it should be measurable by atomic (optical) spectroscopy (see also). It was observed experimentally for the first time in 1958. The theory of the atomic isomeric shift is also used in the interpretation of the Mössbauer isomeric shift.

== Terminology ==
The notion of isomer also appears in other fields such as chemistry and meteorology. Therefore, in the first publications devoted to this effect the name nuclear isomeric shift on spectral lines was used. Before the discovery of the Mössbauer effect, the isomeric shift referred exclusively to atomic spectra; this explains the absence of the word atomic in the initial definition of the effect. Subsequently, the isomeric shift was also observed in gamma spectroscopy through the Mössbauer effect and was called Mössbauer isomeric shift. For further details on the history of the isomeric shift and the terminology used, see.

== Isotopic versus isomeric shift on atomic spectral lines ==
Atomic spectral lines are due to transitions of electrons between different atomic energy levels E, followed by emission of photons. Atomic levels are a manifestation of the electromagnetic interaction between electrons and nuclei. The energy levels of two atoms, the nuclei of which are different isotopes of the same element, are shifted one with respect to the other, despite the fact that the electric charges Z of the two isotopes are identical. This is so because isotopes differ by the number of neutrons, and therefore the masses and volumes of two isotopes are different; these differences give rise to the isotopic shift on atomic spectral lines.

In the case of two nuclear isomers, the number of protons and the number of neutrons are identical, but the quantum states and in particular the energy levels of the two nuclear isomers differ. This difference induces a difference in the electric charge distributions of two isomers and thus a difference δφ in the corresponding electrostatic nuclear potentials φ, which ultimately leads to a difference ΔE in the atomic energy levels. The isomeric shift on atomic spectral lines is then given by

$$\Delta E = -e \int \delta \phi | \psi |^2 \,d\tau,$$

where ψ is the wave function of the electron involved in the transition, e its electric charge, and the integration is performed over the electron coordinates.

The isotopic and the isomeric shift are similar in the sense that both are effects in which the finite size of the nucleus manifests itself and both are due to a difference in the electromagnetic interaction energy between the electrons and the nucleus of the atom. The isotopic shift had been known decades before the isomeric shift and provided useful but limited information about atomic nuclei. Unlike the isomeric shift, the isotopic shift was at first discovered in experiment and then interpreted theoretically (see also). While in the case of the isotopic shift the determination of the interaction energy between electrons and nuclei is a relatively simple electromagnetic problem, for isomers the problem is more involved, since it is the strong interaction, which accounts for the isomeric excitation of the nucleus and thus for the difference of charge distributions of the two isomeric states. This circumstance explains in part why the nuclear isomeric shift was not discovered earlier: the appropriate nuclear theory and in particular the nuclear shell model were developed only in the late 1940s and early 1950s. As to the experimental observation of this shift, it also had to await the development of a new technique, that permitted spectroscopy with isomers, which are metastable nuclei. This too happened only in the 1950s.

While the isomeric shift is sensitive to the internal structure of the nucleus, the isotopic shift is (in a good approximation) not. Therefore, the nuclear physics information that can be obtained from the investigation of the isomeric shift, is superior to what can be obtained from isotopic-shift studies. The measurements through the isomeric shift of e.g. the difference of nuclear radii of the excited and ground state constitute one of the most sensitive tests of nuclear models. Moreover, combined with the Mössbauer effect, the isomeric shift constitutes at present a unique tool in many other fields besides physics.

== The nuclear shell model ==
According to the nuclear shell model, there exists a class of isomers, for which, in a first approximation, it is sufficient to consider one single nucleon, called the "optical" nucleon, to get an estimate of the difference between the charge distributions of the two isomer states, the rest of the nucleons being filtered out. This applies in particular for isomers in odd-proton–even-neutron nuclei, with nearly closed shells. Indium-115, for which the effect was calculated, is such an example. The result of the calculation was that the isomeric shift on atomic spectral lines, although rather small, turned out to be two orders of magnitude bigger than a typical natural line width, which constitutes the limit of optical measurability.

The shift measured three years later in Hg-197 was quite close to that calculated for In-115, although in Hg-197, unlike in In-115, the optical nucleon is a neutron instead of a proton, and the electron–free-neutron interaction is much smaller than the electron—free-proton interaction. This is a consequence of the fact that the optical nucleons are not free, but bound particles. Thus the results could be explained within the theory by associating with the odd optical neutron an effective electric charge of Z/A.

== The Mössbauer isomeric shift ==
The Mössbauer isomeric shift is the shift seen in gamma-ray spectroscopy when one compares two different nuclear isomeric states in two different physical, chemical or biological environments, and is due to the combined effect of the recoil-free Mössbauer transition between the two nuclear isomeric states and the transition between two atomic states in those two environments.

The isomeric shift on atomic spectral lines depends on the electron wave function ψ and on the difference δφ of electrostatic potentials φ of the two isomeric states.

For a given nuclear isomer in two different physical or chemical environments (different physical phases or different chemical combinations), the electron wave functions are also different. Therefore, on top of the isomeric shift on atomic spectral lines, which is due to the difference of the two nuclear isomer states, there will be a shift between the two environments (because of the experimental arrangement, these are called source (s) and absorber (a)). This combined shift is the Mössbauer isomeric shift, and it is described mathematically by the same formalism as the nuclear isomeric shift on atomic spectral lines, except that instead of one electron wave function, that in the source ψ_{s}, one deals with the difference between the electron wave function in the source ψ_{s} and the electron wave function in the absorber ψ_{a}:

$$\Delta E_\text{Mossbauer} = \Delta E_\text{s} - \Delta E_\text{a} = -e \int \delta \phi \big(|\psi_\text{s}|^2 - |\psi_\text{a}|^2\big) \,d\tau.$$

The first measurement of the isomeric shift in gamma spectroscopy with the help of the Mössbauer effect was reported in 1960, two years after its first experimental observation in atomic spectroscopy. By measuring this shift, one obtains important and extremely precise information, both about the nuclear isomer states and about the physical, chemical or biological environment of the atoms, represented by the electronic wave functions.

Under its Mössbauer variant, the isomeric shift has found important applications in domains as different as atomic physics, solid-state physics, nuclear physics, chemistry, biology, metallurgy, mineralogy, geology, and lunar research. For further literature, see also.

The nuclear isomeric shift has also been observed in muonic atoms, that is, atoms in which a muon is captured by the excited nucleus and makes a transition from an atomic excited state to the atomic ground state in a time shorter than the lifetime of the excited isomeric nuclear state.
