= Narrabri Stellar Intensity Interferometer =

Astronomical instrument in New South Wales, Australia (1963–1974)

- Alternative names: NSII
- Location(s): New South Wales, AUS
- Coordinates: 30°12′33″S 149°45′04″E
- Location of Narrabri Stellar Intensity Interferometer

The Narrabri Stellar Intensity Interferometer (NSII) was the first astronomical instrument to measure the diameters of a large number of stars at visible wavelengths. It was designed by (amongst others) Robert Hanbury Brown, who received the Hughes Medal in 1971 for this work. It was built by University of Sydney School of Physics and was located near the town of Narrabri in north-central New South Wales, Australia. Many of the components were constructed in the UK. The design was based on an earlier optical intensity interferometer built by Hanbury Brown and Richard Q. Twiss at Jodrell Bank in the UK. Whilst the original device had a maximum baseline of 10m, the NSII device consisted of a large circular track that allowed the detectors to be separated from 10 to 188m. The NSII operated from 1963 until 1974, and was used to measure the angular diameters of 32 stars.

== See also ==
- Lists of telescopes
