= Gerson Goldhaber =

Particle Physicist and astrophysicist

- Goldhaber at Lawrence Berkeley Laboratory
- Born: February 20, 1924; Chemnitz, Germany
- Died: July 19, 2010 (aged 86); Berkeley, California
- Citizenship: United States
- Education: M.Sc Hebrew University of Jerusalem; Ph.D. University of Wisconsin–Madison
- Known for: Charm meson discovery, dark energy discovery
- Spouse(s): Sulamith Goldhaber; Judith Margoshes
- Awards: Panofsky Prize
- Scientific career
- Fields: Particle physics, cosmology
- Workplaces: Lawrence Berkeley National Laboratory; University of California, Berkeley
- Academic advisors: M.Sc Thesis Advisor Ernst Alexander

Gerson Goldhaber (February 20, 1924 – July 19, 2010) was a German-born American particle physicist and astrophysicist. He was one of the discoverers of the J/ψ meson, which is the bound state of a charm quark and a charm anti-quark. Together with François Pierre, he led the analysis that first revealed actual charmed mesons. He worked at Lawrence Berkeley National Laboratory with the Supernova Cosmology Project, and was a professor of physics at the University of California, Berkeley as well as a professor at Berkeley's graduate school in astrophysics.

== Biography ==
Goldhaber was born on February 20, 1924, in Germany. His Jewish family fled Nazi Germany to Egypt and Goldhaber earned a master's degree in physics in 1947 from the Hebrew University of Jerusalem. Goldhaber was awarded his Ph.D. in 1950 from the University of Wisconsin and became a naturalized citizen of the United States in 1953 while he was on the faculty of Columbia University.

Goldhaber became a professor at the University of California, Berkeley and did additional work at the Lawrence Berkeley National Laboratory. At Berkeley, Goldhaber was part of a particle physics research team that used photographic emulsion to track the movements of subatomic particles in proton-proton scattering experiments that led to the identification of the antiproton, a discovery that earned Owen Chamberlain and Emilio G. Segrè the Nobel Prize in Physics in 1959.

From 1960 to 1961 Goldhaber was a Ford Foundation fellow at CERN, Geneva. During this period he co-authored with his wife and B. Peters a CERN report. A particle he discovered in 1963 was given the name A meson, named after his son Amos.

In 1974, Goldhaber was part of a team at the Stanford Linear Accelerator Center led by Burton Richter that co-discovered the J/ψ meson, a flavor-neutral meson consisting of a charm quark and a charm antiquark. Richter was awarded the Nobel Prize in Physics in 1976 for his research, together with Samuel C. C. Ting of the Massachusetts Institute of Technology who found the particle as part of his own research. For his work on the project, Goldhaber won the American Physical Society's Panofsky Prize and was named California Scientist of the Year.

He later became involved with Rich Muller, Carl Pennypacker and Saul Perlmutter, of the Supernova Cosmology Project. The project, founded in 1988 at Lawrence Berkeley, searched the Universe for signs of supernovae, which could be used to determine the rate at which the Universe was expanding. By 1997, data that the group had gathered provided evidence that the rate of the expansion of the Universe was increasing due to what they termed dark energy, contrary to the prevailing theory that expansion would slow down and ultimately reverse itself with a Big Crunch as the ultimate fate of the universe.

Goldhaber was a member of the United States National Academy of Sciences and the Royal Swedish Academy of Sciences. Together with Robert N. Cahn, Goldhaber co-wrote the text The Experimental Foundations of Particle Physics.

A resident of Berkeley, California, Goldhaber died at his home there at age 86 on July 19, 2010. He was survived by his second wife, science writer Judith Margoshes, as well as two daughters, a son and three grandchildren. During their 41-year marriage, he collaborated with Judith on two books of sonnets, which were illustrated with watercolors he had painted. His marriage to nuclear chemist Sulamith Goldhaber ended with her death from a brain tumor in 1965 while the couple was traveling in India. Goldhaber's brother Maurice was a particle physicist who served as director of the Brookhaven National Laboratory, one of many physicists in Goldhaber's family.

== Awards and honors ==
- Fellow of the American Physical Society
- 1991 – Panofsky Prize of the American Physical Society in recognition of his discovery of charmed mesons
- 1982 – Elected as a foreign member of the Swedish Royal Academy
- 1977 – California Scientist of the Year award, for his work on charmed mesons
- 1976–77 – Morris Loeb Lecturer in Physics, Harvard University
- 1977 – Elected member of the National Academy of Sciences
- 1972–73 – Guggenheim Fellow at CERN
- 1958–59, 1975–76, 1984–85 – Miller Professor at the University of California Berkeley.

== See also ==
- Sulamith Goldhaber — wife and colleague
- Maurice Goldhaber — brother
- Nat Goldhaber — son

== Bibliography ==
- "Goldhaber Biography". Lawrence Berkeley National Laboratory Institute for Nuclear and Particle Astrophysic. Archived from the original on August 18, 2011.
- Perlman, David (July 22, 2010). "Gerson Goldhaber, world-famed physicist, dies". San Francisco Chronicle. San Francisco: Hearst Corporation. p. C - 4. Archived from the original on November 4, 2012.
- Yarris, Lynn (July 21, 2010). "In Memoriam: Gerson Goldhaber, renowned physicist". News Center. Berkeley, California: Lawrence Berkeley National Laboratory. Archived from the original on July 22, 2010.
- Hoffman, Jascha (July 25, 2010). "Gerson Goldhaber, Particle Physicist, Is Dead at 86". New York Times.
