= Intensity interferometer =

Astronomy device

An intensity interferometer is the name given to devices that use the Hanbury Brown and Twiss effect. In astronomy, the most common use of such an astronomical interferometer is to determine the apparent diameter of a radio source or star. If the distance to the object can then be determined by parallax or some other method, the physical diameter of the star can then be inferred. An example of an optical intensity interferometer is the Narrabri Stellar Intensity Interferometer. In quantum optics, some devices which take advantage of correlation and anti-correlation effects in beams of photons might be said to be intensity interferometers, although the term is usually reserved for observatories.

An intensity interferometer is built from two light detectors, typically either radio antenna or optical telescopes with photomultiplier tubes (PMTs), separated by some distance, called the baseline. Both detectors are pointed at the same astronomical source, and intensity measurements are then transmitted to a central correlator facility. A major advantage of intensity interferometers is that only the measured intensity observed by each detector must be sent to the central correlator facility, rather than the amplitude and phase of the signal. The intensity interferometer measures interferometric visibilities like all other astronomical interferometers. These measurements can be used to calculate the diameter and limb darkening coefficients of stars, but with intensity interferometers aperture synthesis images cannot be produced as the visibility phase information is not preserved by an intensity interferometer.
