= Robert Hanbury Brown =

British astronomer and physicist ((1916–2002)

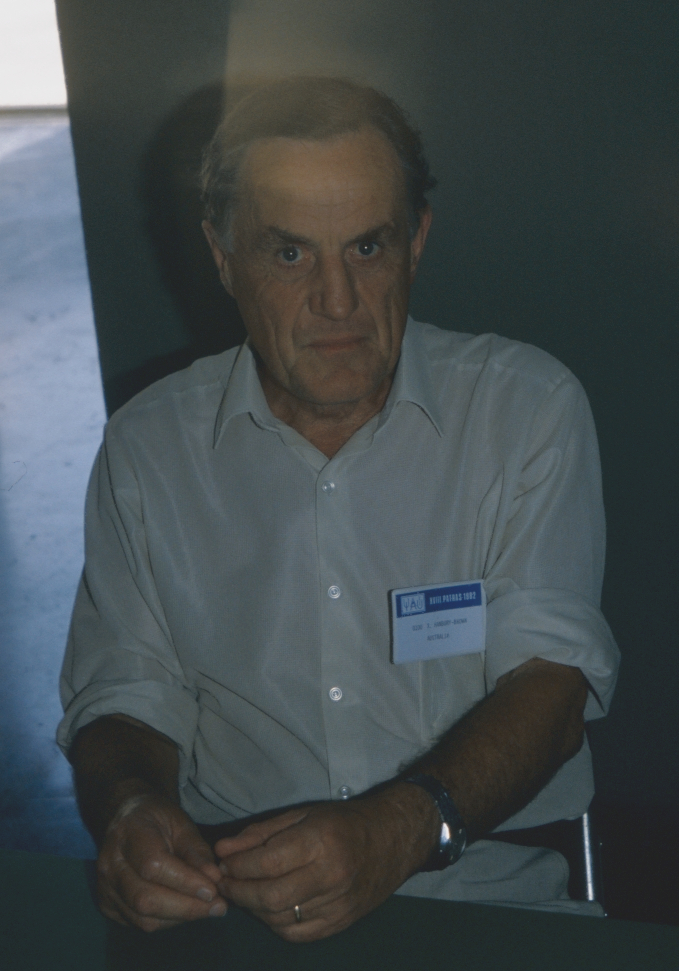
- Hanbury Brown in 1982
- Born: 31 August 1916; Aruvankadu, British India
- Died: 16 January 2002 (aged 85); Andover, Hampshire
- Education: University of London
- Spouse: Heather Hilda Chesterman
- Awards: ANZAAS Medal (1987)
- Scientific career
- Fields: Astrophysics
- Notable students: Cyril Hazard

Robert Hanbury Brown, AC FRS (31 August 1916 – 16 January 2002) was a British astronomer and physicist born in Aruvankadu, India. He made notable contributions to the development of radar and later conducted pioneering work in the field of radio astronomy.

With Richard Q. Twiss he developed the Hanbury Brown and Twiss effect leading to the creation of intensity interferometers. Hanbury Brown was one of the main designers of the Narrabri Stellar Intensity Interferometer and received a number of honours and awards for his work.

== Early years ==
Hanbury Brown was born in Aruvankadu, the Nilgiris, British India in 1916, the son of an army officer. At age 8 he was sent to England to attend Cottesmore preparatory school in Hove, where he was educated in primarily non-scientific subjects. In 1930, at age 14, Hanbury Brown went on to attend Tonbridge School in Kent for only two years before changing to Brighton Technical College. Though originally planning to become a classics scholar, the change to a technical college came due to influences from those around him. His grandfather, Sir Robert Hanbury Brown, K.C.M.G., a notable irrigation engineer, was also one of the early pioneers of radio, and following Hanbury Brown's parents' divorce, his legal guardian was a consulting radio engineer. At Brighton Technical College, Hanbury Brown studied for an external Bachelor's degree in electrical engineering from the University of London, which he received at the age of 19. At this time he also published his first paper, 'Lamp polar curves on the cathode-ray oscillograph'.

== Career ==
Though initially planning to study for a Ph.D. at Imperial College, London, Hanbury Brown drew the attention of Henry Tizard. Tizard recruited Hanbury Brown to work for what would become the Telecommunications Research Establishment on Chain Home in 1936, where he worked until 1942; after this he spent 3 years in Washington, D.C. to work with the Combined Research Group at the Naval Research Laboratory developing the Rebecca/Eureka transponding radar which he and John William Sutton Pringle originally invented. By 1947 a consultancy that had been set up by Sir Robert Watson-Watt, the father of radar, offered more interesting prospects for the conversion of wartime developments into peacetime technologies. Hanbury Brown was recruited and worked as a consulting engineer until Watson-Watt moved the firm to Canada. After considering his career possibilities, Hanbury Brown joined Bernard Lovell's radio astronomy group at the University of Manchester in 1949 to work on his PhD.

At the University of Manchester, Hanbury Brown worked with Cyril Hazard to modify the 218-ft radio telescope built for the study of cosmic rays into a fully functioning radio telescope. Using it they showed, among other things, that radio waves were being emitted from the Andromeda Galaxy; proving that such emissions were not just from our own galaxy. After completion of the Lovell Telescope Hanbury was among those who used it to discover quasars.

Hanbury Brown is primarily known for his work on interferometry, in particular the Hanbury Brown and Twiss effect which led to intensity interferometers. Despite opposition from some in the scientific community who argued that his predictions violated the laws of physics, Hanbury Brown and Twiss showed that their theory was correct through a number of observations.

In 1962 Hanbury Brown moved to Australia to work at the University of Sydney. There he built his next interferometer – the Narrabri Stellar Intensity Interferometer – in a sheep paddock outside Narrabri in New South Wales, consisting of two 23 ft telescopes. Using it, Hanbury Brown succeeded in measuring the diameters of 32 stars, thus producing the first empirical temperature scale for hot stars. Despite only aiming to stay in Australia for two years, he stayed for a total of 27; going on to receive the Companion of the Order of Australia honour in 1986 for his work.

== Personal life ==
Hanbury Brown married Heather Hilda Chesterman in 1952 with whom he had one daughter and two sons (twins). He was rumoured to have prompted the term boffin.

In 1990, Hanbury Brown was interviewed by Caroline Jones on her Radio National program, The Search for Meaning.

Hanbury Brown died in Andover, Hampshire on 16 January 2002.

== Honours and awards ==
He won the Fernand Holweck Medal and Prize in 1959. In March 1960 he was elected a Fellow of the Royal Society of London and in 1971 was awarded their Hughes Medal for " his efforts in developing the optical stellar intensity interferometer and for his observations of Spica". In 1968, he received the Eddington Medal jointly with Twiss (see Hanbury Brown and Twiss effect). He also won the Thomas Ranken Lyle Medal of the Australian Academy of Science in 1972. In 1982 he was named President of the International Astronomical Union, a title he retained until the end of his term in 1985. In 1986 he was appointed Companion of the Order of Australia. He was awarded the Albert A. Michelson Medal of the Franklin Institute in 1982, jointly with Richard Q. Twiss and the Matthew Flinders Medal and Lecture the same year.

== Publications ==
He wrote an autobiographical account of the development of airborne and ground-based radar, and his subsequent work on radio astronomy. Since he was rumoured to have been the original boffin who inspired the term, he called these recollections Boffin: A Personal Story of the Early Days of Radar, Radio Astronomy and Quantum Optics

- Hanbury Brown and Twiss, Nature, Vol. 178, pp. 1046 1956
- Hanbury Brown et al., Mon. Not. R. Astron. Soc., Vol. 167, pp 121–136 1974
- Hanbury Brown, Boffin : A Personal Story of the Early Days of Radar, Radio Astronomy and Quantum Optics ISBN 0-7503-0130-9.
- Hanbury Brown, The Wisdom of Science – its relevance to Culture & Religion (ISBN 0-521-31448-8).

Hanbury Brown is author of 127 articles and other scientific works, published over a 67-year period of activity (1935–2002). The full list of his contributions can be found in a document made available by the Royal Society Publishing Organisation, at the following url: http://rsbm.royalsocietypublishing.org/content/49/83/suppl/DC1

The Hanbury Brown Papers were catalogued by Anna-K Mayer and Tim Powell, NCUACS, and have been deposited with the Royal Society, London.
