= NGC 4156 =

Galaxy in the constellation Canes Venatici

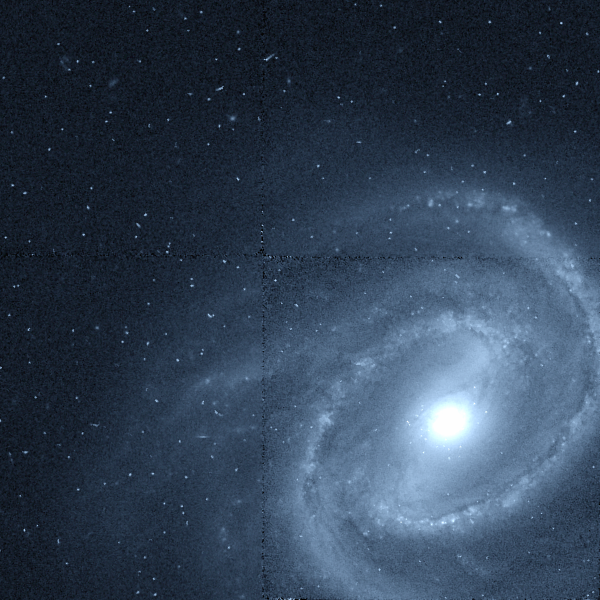
- NGC 4156 imaged by Hubble Space Telescope

Observation data (J2000 epoch)
- Constellation: Canes Venatici
- Right ascension: 12^{h} 10^{m} 49.6010^{s}
- Declination: +39° 28′ 22.125″
- Redshift: 0.022617 ± 0.000008
- Heliocentric radial velocity: 6,780 ± 2 km/s
- Distance: 216 ± 111 Mly (66.3 ± 34.2 Mpc)
- Apparent magnitude (V): 13.1

Characteristics
- Type: SB(rs)b
- Size: ~88,900 ly (27.25 kpc) (estimated)
- Apparent size (V): 0.96′ × 0.77′

Other designations
- HOLM 345B, UGC 7173, MCG +07-25-045, PGC 38773, CGCG 215-047

NGC 4156 is a barred spiral galaxy in the constellation Canes Venatici. The galaxy lies about 220 million light years away from Earth based on redshift-independent methods, which means, given its apparent dimensions, that NGC 4156 is approximately 90,000 light years across. Based on redshift the galaxy lies 325 million light years away. It was discovered by German-British astronomer William Herschel on March 17, 1787.

== Characteristics ==
The galaxy has a narrow bar and two high-surface brightness spiral arms. The bar appears slightly asymmetric, with the eastern part slightly longer than the western. A dust lane is visible in the bulge. The arms form a pseudoring about 0.34 arcminutes across. A chain of HII regions in the ring runs along the edge of the lens in the southern part of the pseudoring but not at the north. The north chain of HII regions is prominent along the middle part of the ring rather than near the edge of the bar, which is the norm. The eastern arms appear to bifurcate towards its end. Several faint spiral arms are also visible, two of which are connected with the main arms towards their brighter ends. Ultraviolet emission is detected along the optical arms. A northwards filament emerges from the galaxy and seems to encompass another galaxy towards its end.

=== Nucleus ===
NGC 4156 has a small, bright nucleus. The nucleus emits far and mid ultraviolet light and X-ray emission was detected by the Einstein Observatory. The observed flux was observed to decrease by a factor of two in a few months. Weak emission lines were also observed. The X-ray emission means that the nucleus of NGC 4156 is active and the narrow emission lines observed in optical light lead to its categorisation as a LINER, as the optical narrow-line flux ratios made it unfeasible to unambiguously denote it as a Seyfert galaxy. The most accepted theory for the energy source of active galactic nuclei is the presence of an accretion disk around a supermassive black hole. The mass of the black hole in the centre of NGC 4156 is estimated to be (1.4±0.1)×10^{8} M_{☉}.

Optical data taken in 2019 have revealed the appearance of a broad-line region (BLR) component in the Hα and Hβ line profiles, together with a rising blue continuum. The BLR components have been confirmed by 2022 follow-up observations, whereas the rising continuum has disappeared. In both 2019 and 2022, the broad Hα is bright and well detected, whilst the broad Hβ emission line is barely detected and harder to identify, especially in 2022. This suggests that in 2019 and 2022 NGC 4156 was in two intermediate states of its 2-to-1 type round-trip evolution, being a type 1.5 in 2019 and type 1.8 in 2022 and thus classifying NGC 4156 as a change-looking Active Galactic Nucleus.

The spectral evolution and type transitions observed in the optical over the last twenty years might be the result of variable dust absorption, shielding the central AGN along the line of sight, or changes in the accretion rate. XMM-Newton data show no clear signs of absorption. Therefore, if absorption is the main responsible for the observed change in the optical, such obscuring material is not attenuating the flux at higher energies.

== Supernovae ==
Two supernovae have been observed in NGC 4156:

- SN 1974A was discovered by Halton Arp on 28 January 1974 at an apparent magnitude of 20. Its type is unknown.
- SN 2025bvm was discovered on 17 February 2025 by Asteroid Terrestrial-impact Last Alert System at an apparent magnitude of 18.8. Based on its spectrum it was categorised as a Type Ia supernova several days before maximum.

== Nearby galaxies ==
NGC 4156 lies 5.2 arcminutes from NGC 4151 and 7 arcminutes from Holm 345c. The north outer arm of NGC 4151 nearly overlaps with NGC 4156. However the pairing is optical as NGC 4156 lies at a much larger redshift than NGC 4151. NGC 4151 forms a triplet with UGC 7071 and KUG 1208+386, which lie at a similar redshift.

== Gallery ==
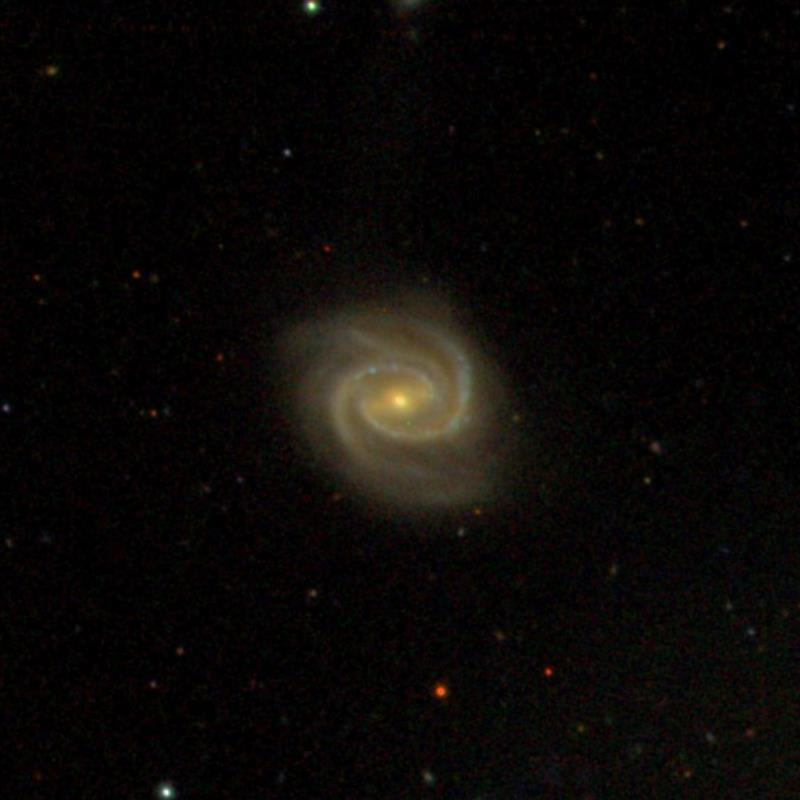
NGC 4156 imaged by the Sloan Digital Sky Survey

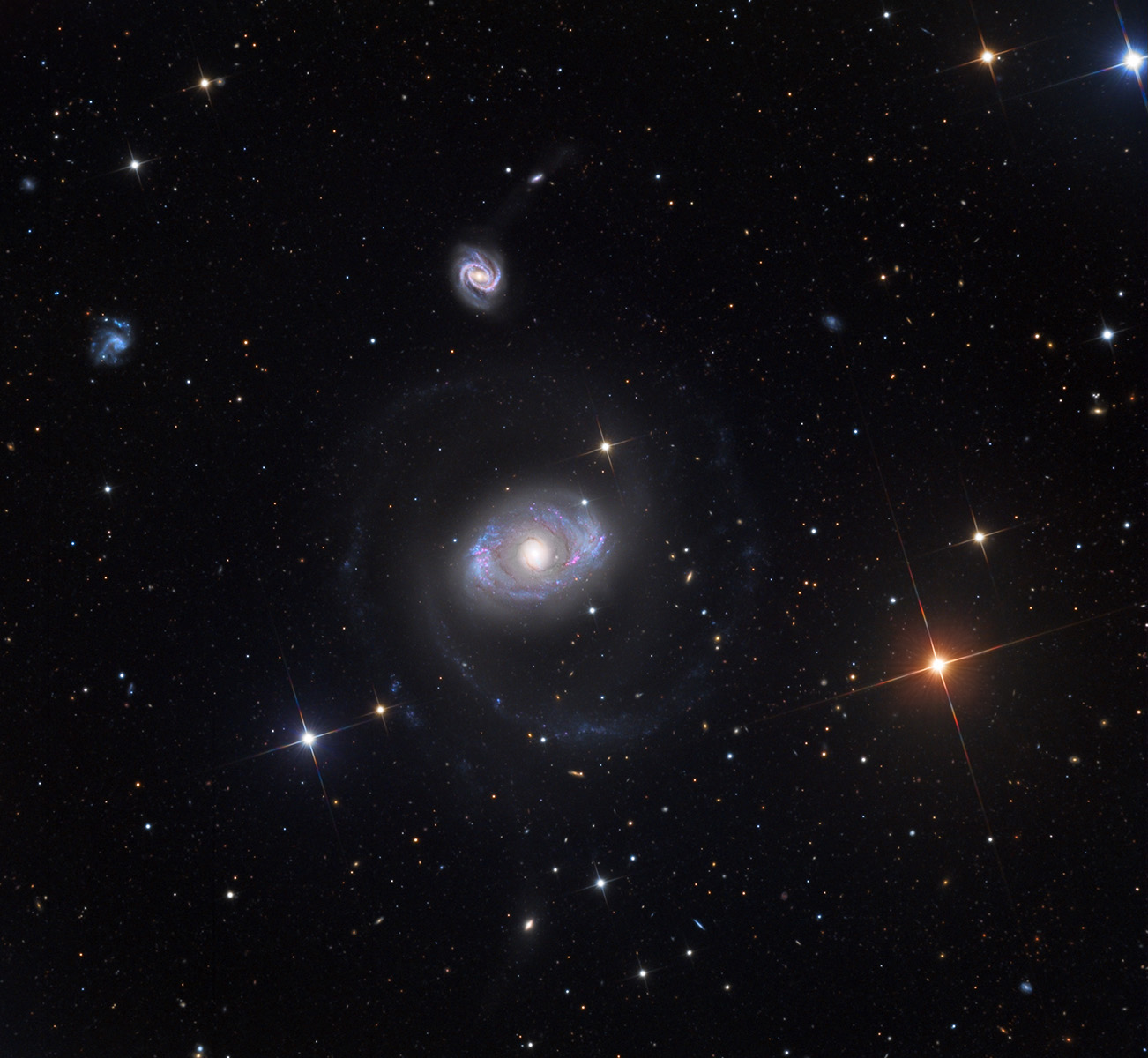
NGC 4151 with NGC 4156 imaged by the Mount Lemmon Observatory
