= Twin Quasar =

Astronomical object with two images

The Twin Quasar Q0957+561
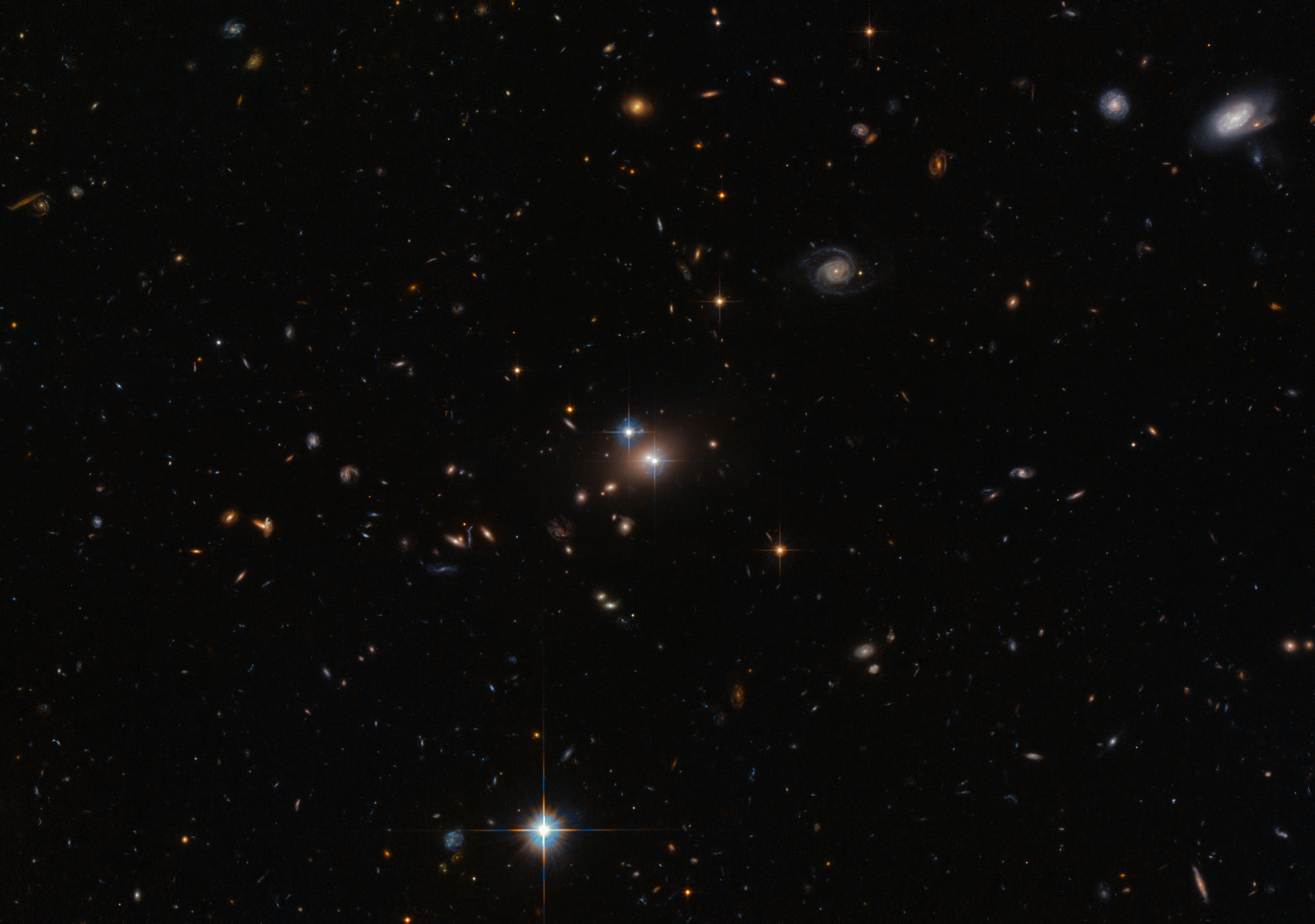
- The Twin Quasar QSO 0957+561, which lies 8.7 billion light-years from Earth, is seen right in the center of this picture.

Observation data (Epoch J2000)
- Constellation: Ursa Major
- Right ascension: 10^{h} 01^{m} 20.99^{s}
- Declination: +55° 53′ 56.5″
- Redshift: 1.413
- Distance: 8,700,000,000 ly (2,400,000,000 pc)
- Type: Rad
- Apparent dimensions (V): 6" distance
- Apparent magnitude (V): 16.7

Other designations
- Twin Quasar, Double Quasar, Twin QSO, QSO 0957+561, Q0957+561, SBS 0957+561, TXS 0957+561, 8C 0958+561, PGC 2518326, A: USNO-A2 1425-7427021 B:USNO-A2 1425-7427023

The Twin Quasar (also known as Twin QSO, Double Quasar, SBS 0957+561, TXS 0957+561, Q0957+561 or QSO 0957+561 A/B), discovered in 1979, was the first identified gravitationally lensed quasar, It is a single quasar that appears in images as two identical quasars as a consequence of gravitational lensing.

== Quasar ==
The Twin Quasar is a single quasar whose appearance is distorted by the gravity of a galaxy along the line of sight from Earth. This gravitational lensing effect is a result of the warping of space-time by the nearby galaxy, as described by general relativity. The single quasar thus appears as two separate images, separated by 6 arcseconds. Both images have an apparent magnitude of 17, with the A component having 16.7 and the B component having 16.5. There is a 417 ± 3-day time lag between the two images.

The Twin Quasar lies at redshift z = 1.41 (8.7 billion ly), while the lensing galaxy lies at redshift z = 0.355 (3.7 billion ly). The lensing galaxy with apparent dimension of 0.42×0.22 arcminutes lies almost in line with the B image, lying 1 arcsecond off. The quasar lies 10 arcminutes north of NGC 3079, in the constellation Ursa Major. The astronomical data services SIMBAD and NASA/IPAC Extragalactic Database (NED) list several other names for this system.

== Lens ==
The lensing galaxy, YGKOW G1 (sometimes called G1 or Q0957+561 G1), is a giant elliptical (type cD) lying within a cluster of galaxies that also contributed to the lensing.

== History ==
The quasars QSO 0957+561A/B were discovered in early 1979 by an Anglo-American team around Dennis Walsh, Robert Carswell and Ray Weymann, with the aid of the 2.1 m Telescope at Kitt Peak National Observatory in Arizona, United States. The team noticed that the two quasars were unusually close to each other, and that their redshift and visible light spectrum were very similar to each other. They published their suggestion of "the possibility that they are two images of the same object formed by a gravitational lens".

The Twin Quasar was one of the first directly observable effects of gravitational lensing, which was described in 1936 by Albert Einstein as a consequence of his 1916 general theory of relativity, though in that 1936 paper he also predicted "Of course, there is no hope of observing this phenomenon directly."

Critics identified a difference in appearance between the two quasars in radio frequency images. In mid-1979, a team led by David Roberts at the Very Large Array (VLA) near Socorro, New Mexico, discovered a relativistic jet emerging from quasar A with no corresponding equivalent in quasar B. Furthermore, the distance between the two images, 6 arcseconds, was too great to have been produced by the gravitational effect of the galaxy G1, a galaxy identified near quasar B.

In 1980, Peter J. Young and collaborators discovered that galaxy G1 is part of a galaxy cluster which increases the gravitational deflection and can explain the observed distance between the images. Finally, a team led by Marc V. Gorenstein observed essentially identical relativistic jets on very small scales from both A and B in 1983 using Very Long Baseline Interferometry (VLBI). Subsequent, more detailed VLBI observations demonstrated the expected (parity reversed) magnification of the image B jet with respect to image A jet. The difference between the large-scale radio images is attributed to the special geometry needed for gravitational lensing, which is satisfied by the quasar but not by all of the extended jet emission seen by the VLA near image A.

Slight spectral differences between quasar A and quasar B can be explained by different densities of the intergalactic medium in the light paths, resulting in differing extinction.

30 years of observation made it clear that image A of the quasar reaches earth about 14 months earlier than the corresponding image B, resulting in a difference of path length of 1.1 ly.

== Possible planet ==
In 1996, a team at Harvard-Smithsonian Center for Astrophysics led by Rudy E. Schild discovered an anomalous fluctuation in one image's light curve, which they speculated was caused by a planet approximately three Earth masses in size within the lensing galaxy. This conjecture cannot be proven because the chance alignment that led to its discovery will never happen again. If it could be confirmed, however, it would make it the most distant known planet, 4 billion ly away.

== Candidate magnetospheric eternally collapsing object ==
In 2006, R. E. Schild suggested that the accreting object at the heart of Q0957+561 is not a supermassive black hole, as is generally believed for all quasars, but a magnetospheric eternally collapsing object. Schild's team at the Harvard-Smithsonian Center for Astrophysics asserted that "this quasar appears to be dynamically dominated by a magnetic field internally anchored to its central, rotating supermassive compact object" (R. E. Schild).

== See also ==
- Cloverleaf quasar
- Cosmic string
- Gravitational lens
- Hypothetical astronomical object
