= Alison Rose =

Alison Rose may refer to:

- Alison Rose (diplomat) (born 1961), an English diplomat and college principal
- Alison Rose (banker) (born 1969), British banking executive
- Alison Rose (golfer) (born 1968), Scottish golfer
- Alison Rose (writer) (1944–2025), American model and actress
- Alison E. Rose, Canadian documentary film director
