= Stanley Robertson =

Stanley (Stan) Robertson may refer to:

- Stanley Robertson (folk singer) (1940–2009), Scottish folk singer and storyteller
- Stanley Robertson, physicist who proposed the concept of magnetospheric eternally collapsing objects
