= Star Men =

Star Men is a 2015 documentary film directed by Alison E. Rose that follows four British astronomers—Donald Lynden-Bell, Roger Griffin, Neville Woolf and Wallace Sargent—as they retrace a road trip across the American South West.
