= F. J. M. Stratton =

British astrophysicist and military officer

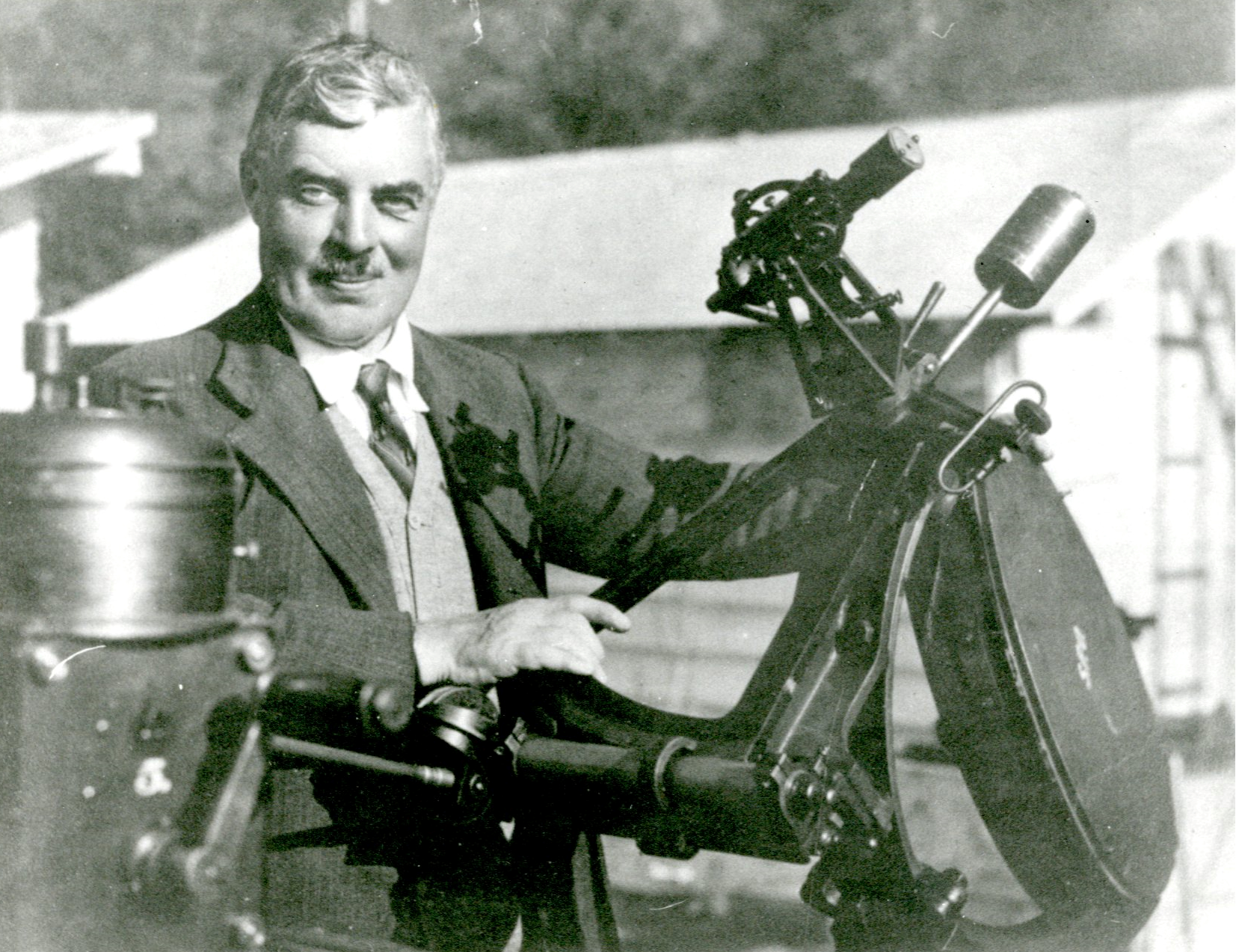
- Born: 16 October 1881; Edgbaston, England
- Died: 2 September 1960 (aged 78); Cambridge, England
- Military career
- Allegiance: United Kingdom
- Branch: British Army
- Service years: 1910–1945
- Rank: Lieutenant-Colonel
- Conflicts: World War I World War II
- Awards: Territorial Decoration; Officer of the Order of the British Empire; Distinguished Service Order; Prix Jules Janssen

Lieutenant-Colonel Frederick John Marrian Stratton DSO OBE DL TD FRS PRAS (16 October 1881 – 2 September 1960) was a British astrophysicist, Professor of Astrophysics (1909) at the University of Cambridge from 1928 to 1947 and a decorated British Army officer.

== Early life ==
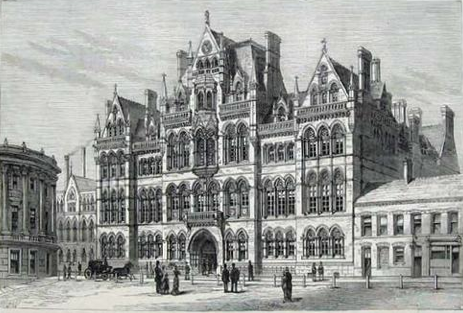
Mason College, now the University of Birmingham

The youngest of six sons and two daughters, Stratton was born at Edgbaston in Birmingham, to Stephen Samuel Stratton, a music critic and historian, and Mary Jane Marrian. He remembered Dvorak and Ebenezer Prout visiting his father. In 1891, he received a scholarship to King Edward's Grammar School in Five Ways, Birmingham, advanced to Mason College in 1897 (which later became the University of Birmingham) and won an entrance scholarship to Gonville and Caius College, Cambridge, in 1900, entering the university in October 1901. He took a London BA (External) in Greek, Latin and maths in 1903, and graduated in 1904 with the distinction of Third Wrangler in Part I of the Mathematical Tripos (Arthur Eddington was Senior Wrangler that year). He was placed in Class I, Division II of the second part of the Tripos the following year, also receiving the Tyson Medal in astronomy and an Isaac Newton Studentship. In 1906 he won a Smith's Prize and was elected a Fellow of his college, which he remained until his death.

== Military service ==
In 1901, Statton had joined the Caius Company of the Cambridge University Rifle Volunteers, which became the Cambridge University Officers Training Corps in 1908. Partly instrumental in forming the Communications (later Signals) Company as a cadet corporal, he was commissioned a second lieutenant in the Territorial Army on 17 August 1910. A provisional captain in the unit when war erupted in 1914, he was commissioned a temporary captain in the Corps of Royal Engineers on 8 September 1914. As a temporary major, he became Officer Commanding (Signals) of the 20th Divisional Signal Company, Royal Engineers, and took his company to France in the summer of 1915 to join the BEF. He was awarded a DSO in 1917 and promoted to acting lieutenant-colonel on 22 July, becoming Assistant Director Signals (later chief signals officer) of the 19th Corps BEF under Lt-Gen. Watts. He was praised by his fellow officers for his efficiency and perpetual cheerfulness, managing to remain alert even after days without sleep, and was mentioned in despatches five times. On 29 January 1919, Stratton was appointed a knight of the Légion d'honneur of France.

Upon returning to Cambridge in 1919 with the rank of major (brevet lieutenant-colonel), he re-formed the signals section of the Officers Training Corps, and commanded it until 1928. For his military service, he was appointed an Officer of the Order of the British Empire, Military Division (OBE) in the 1929 King's Birthday Honours list. In 1921, Stratton became the university representative for the Cambridgeshire Territorial Army Association, serving as its president from 1934 to 1940.

Although nearly 60 when war erupted again in 1939, Stratton eagerly volunteered to return to active service. After persuading the War Office, he was given command of an Officer Cadet Training Unit. However, he was soon reassigned to the Royal Corps of Signals and given a special-duties role concerned with radio security. As a result, Stratton spent the war travelling extensively across the British Empire and also to the United States. Having exceeded the age limit for retirement, he relinquished his commission in the Territorial Army on 20 October 1945, retaining the rank of brevet lieutenant-colonel.

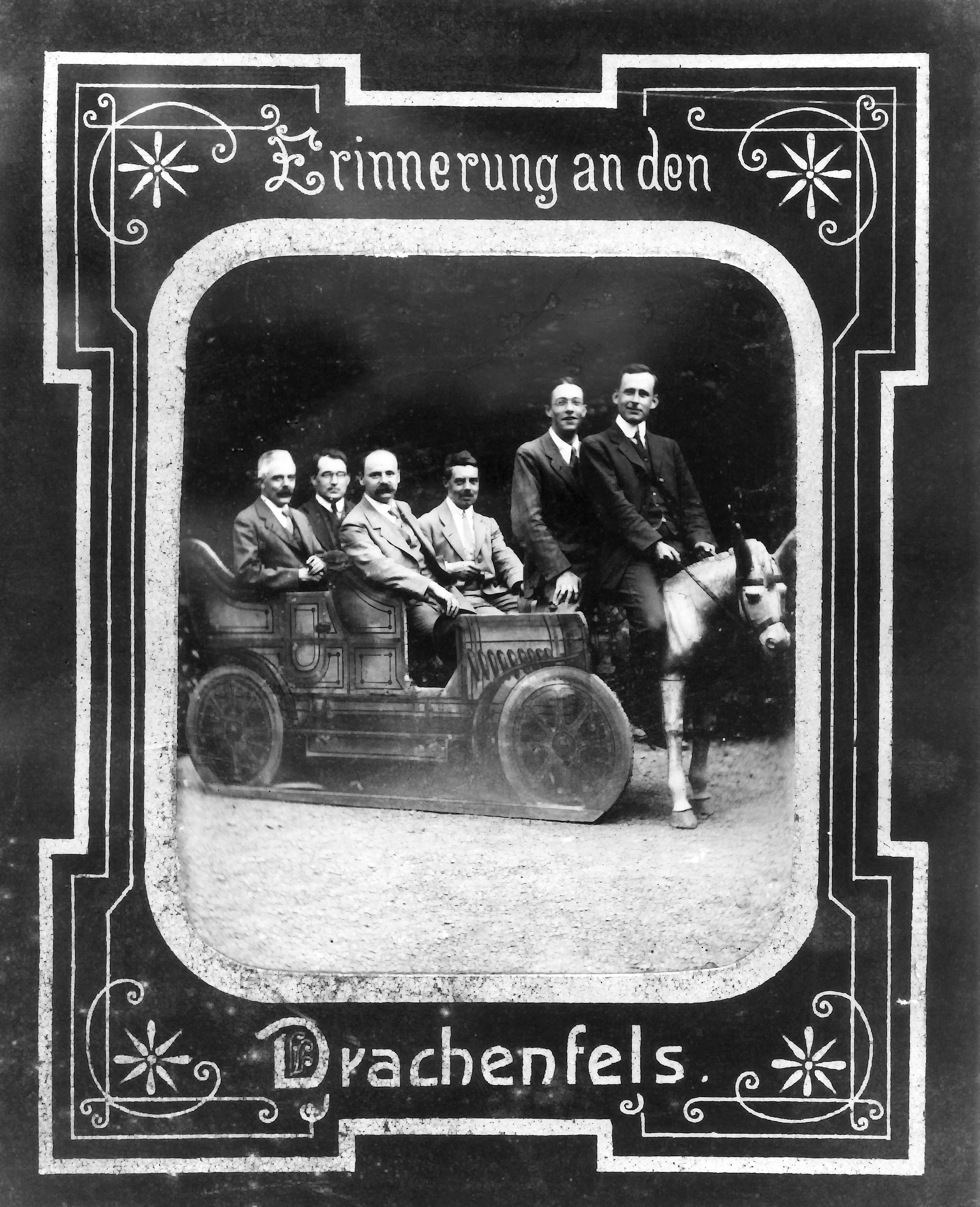
Stratton, left; possibly during the Fifth Conference of the International Union for Co-operation in Solar Research, held in Bonn, Germany, 1913

== Scientific career ==
After a few years as mathematical lecturer at Cambridge he became Assistant Director of the Solar Physics Observatory from 1913 to 1919, then Tutor at Caius College from 1919 to 1928 and finally Professor of Astrophysics and Director of the Solar Physics Observatory (Director of the Combined Observatories after the amalgamation in 1946 with the Cambridge Observatory) from 1928 to 1947. He also wrote the main historical account of the Cambridge Observatories. He was president of the Royal Astronomical Society in 1933–35. In 1947 he was elected a Fellow of the Royal Society. In 1952 he was awarded the Prix Jules Janssen by the Société astronomique de France.

== Personal life and death ==
Stratton held interest in parapsychology. He was the president of the Society for Psychical Research in 1953–1955.

Stratton died in Cambridge in 1960, aged 78. He never married.
