= Peter J. Young =

British astrophysicist

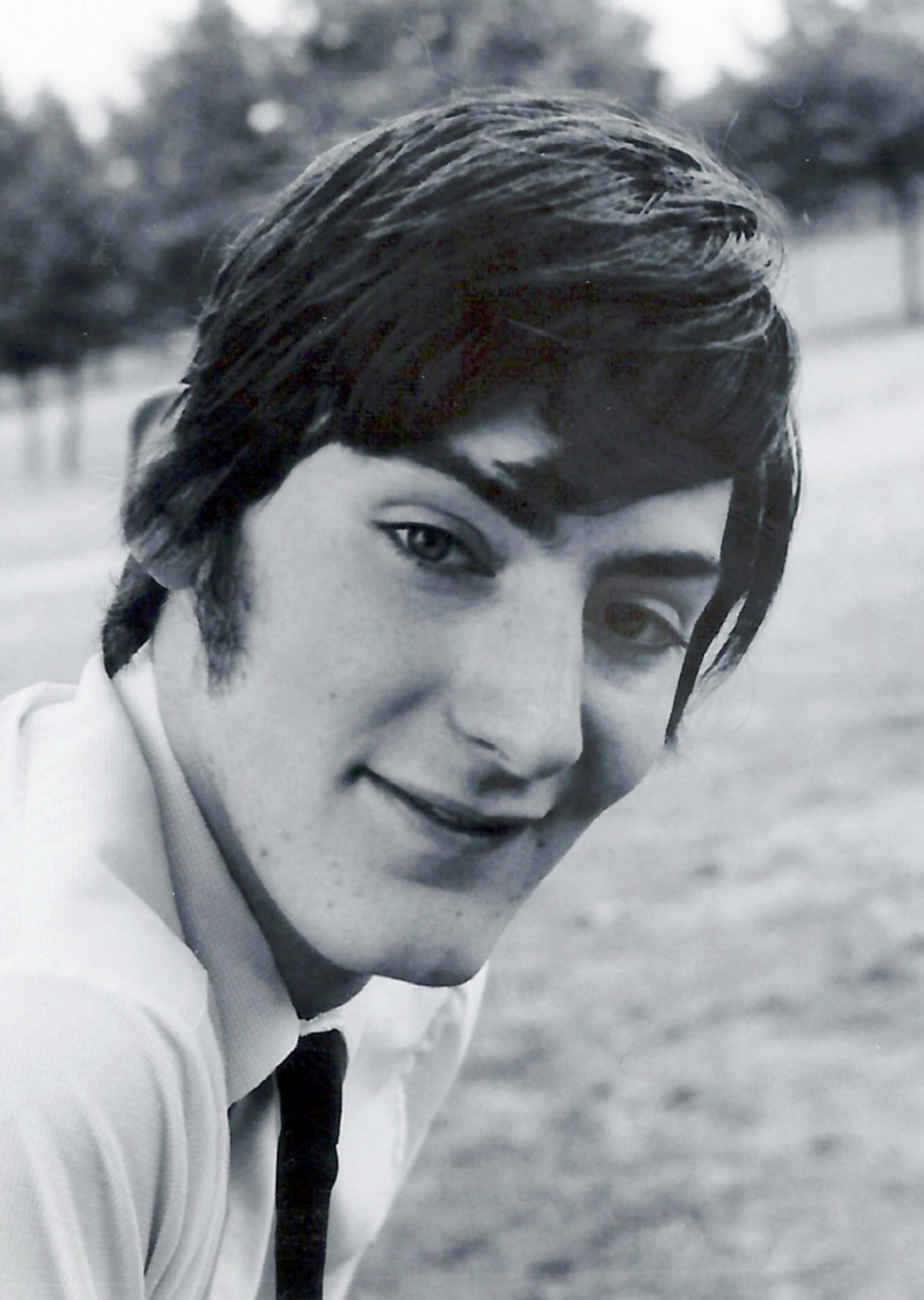
- Born: July 31, 1954; England
- Died: September 5, 1981 (aged 27); Pasadena
- Education: University of Cambridge (BS); University of Texas at Austin (MS); California Institute of Technology (PhD)
- Known for: Discovery of intergalactic medium; detection of black hole in M87; gravitational lensing and microlensing
- Scientific career
- Fields: Cosmology, Astrophysics
- Workplaces: California Institute of Technology
- Doctoral advisor: Wallace Sargent

Peter John Young (31 July 1954—5 September 1981) was a British astrophysicist who made major contributions to extragalactic astronomy and cosmology. He obtained his PhD from California Institute of Technology in 1981. His contributions include the discovery of the intergalactic medium, the detection of a supermassive black hole in the galaxy M87, the identification of the optical counterpart to the first gravitational lens, and the theory of gravitational microlensing.

== Early life and education ==
Educated at Leeds Grammar School, Young studied mathematics at St John's College, Cambridge (1972-1975), where he was Senior Wrangler (highest-placed First Class degree) in 1975. He obtained a master's degree in astronomy under the supervision of Gerard de Vaucouleurs at the University of Texas, Austin in 1976. He then began his PhD at the California Institute of Technology under the supervision of Wallace Sargent. He completed this degree in 18 months and was employed for a further year as a postdoctoral researcher. He joined the Caltech faculty as an assistant professor in 1979, aged 25.

== Scientific achievements ==
Young and his PhD supervisor Wallace Sargent worked with Alexander Boksenberg and made use of the Mount Palomar 200-inch Hale Telescope with Boksenberg's Image Photon Counting Spectrograph (IPCS), the first photon-counting device used in astronomy, to conduct research.

In 1978, Young et al. and Sargent et al. provided photometric and spectroscopic evidence for a supermassive black hole in the nucleus of the elliptical galaxy M87. This object was latterly revealed via direct high-resolution imaging by the Event Horizon Telescope.

In 1980, Sargent, Young, Boksenberg, and Tytler studied the Lyman-alpha forest in the rest-frame ultraviolet portion of quasar spectra, concluding that it arose from absorption by a cosmological distribution of partly ionized neutral Hydrogen. They also established the existence of the intergalactic medium. Also in 1980, Young et al. identified the galaxy responsible for the first gravitational lens, the Double Quasar Q0957+561. This paper produced the first detailed mass models for a cosmological lensing event.

In 1981, Young realized that the multiple images in Q0957+561 would be affected by the gravitational fields of a large number of stars in the lensing galaxy, leading to rapid fluctuations in the magnification of the quasar images. His theoretical study of these superimposed gravitational deflections helped initiate the subject of gravitational microlensing.

By the time of his death after five years at Caltech, Young had written 33 papers.

== Death ==
On 5 September 1981, Young committed suicide by taking potassium cyanide which he had obtained from a chemistry stockroom at the university. According to Sargent and Peter Goldreich, Young had suffered from depression and psychological issues since his time at Cambridge and had previously talked about killing himself.
