= Roger Griffin (astronomer) =

British astronomer (1935–2021)

Roger F. Griffin
- Griffin in 2007
- Born: 23 August 1935
- Died: 12 February 2021 (aged 85)
- Education: University of Cambridge
- Scientific career
- Fields: Astronomy
- Workplaces: University of Cambridge, California Institute of Technology

Roger Francis Griffin (23 August 1935 – 12 February 2021) was an astronomer and emeritus professor of Observational Astronomy at the University of Cambridge.

Griffin was raised in Surrey, and educated at Caterham School and St John's College, Cambridge, where he studied for a BA in Natural Sciences and a PhD in astronomy. After receiving his doctorate he was a Research Fellow at St John's, and a Fellow there from 1972 until his death. His most notable works are in the area of spectrography of stars.

Griffin featured, along with Donald Lynden-Bell, Neville Woolf, and Wallace Sargent, in the 2015 documentary Star Men, which detailed their camaraderie and contributions to astronomy, and retraced their trip through the Southwestern United States.

== Major publications ==
- Griffin RF. Positions of optical objects in the fields of 42 radio sources. The Astronomical Journal. 1963 Aug;68:421. According to Google Scholar, this article has been cited 107 times.
- Krisciunas K, Griffin RF, Guinan EF, Luedeke KD, McCook GP. 9 Aurigae: strong evidence for non-radial pulsations. Monthly Notices of the Royal Astronomical Society. 1995 Apr 1;273(3):662-74. According to Google Scholar, this article has been cited 49 times.
- Griffin, RF. A Photometric Atlas of the Spectrum of Arcturus, λλ 3600-8825 Å. Cambridge Philosophical Society. 1968. 302 citations.
