= Dennis Walsh =

British astronomer

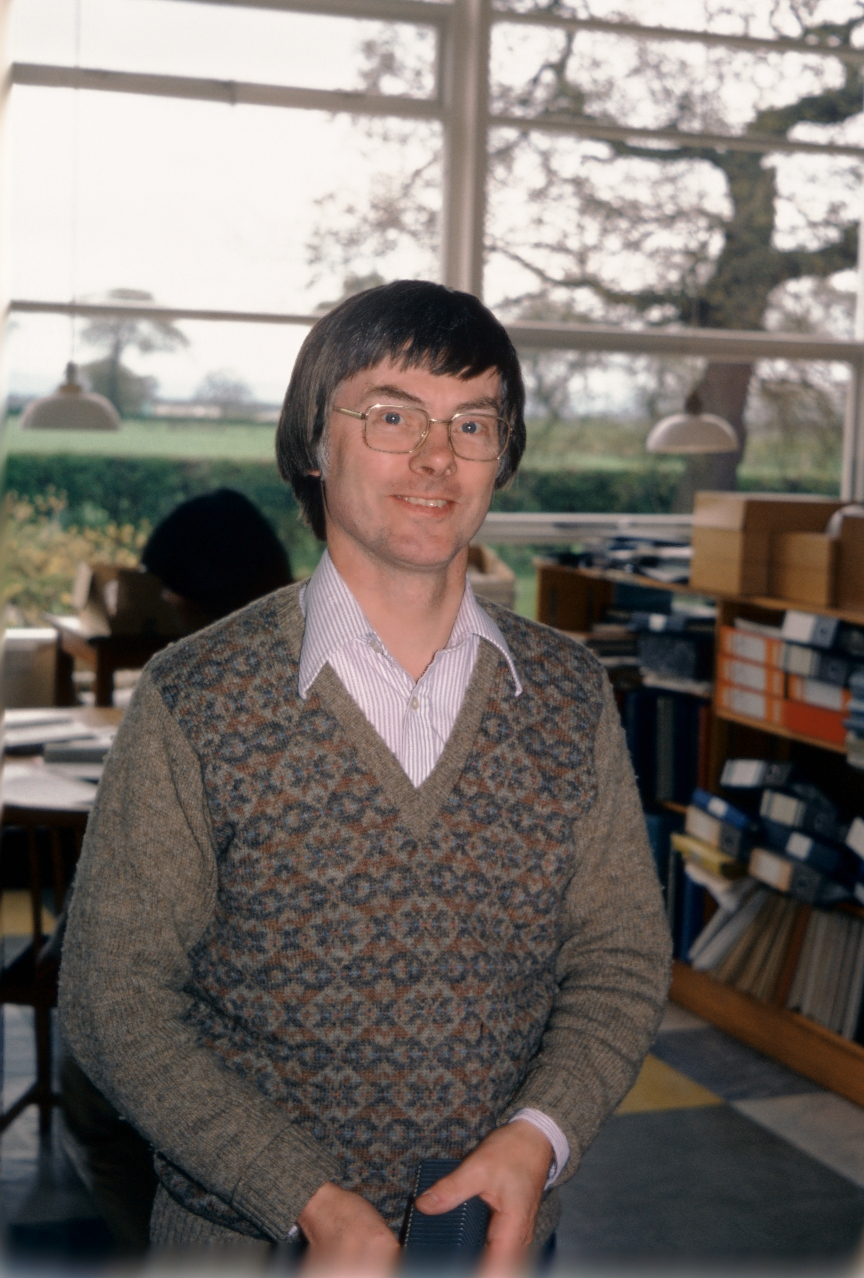
Dennis Walsh, May 1981, at Jodrell Bank, England.

Dennis Walsh (12 June 1933 – 1 June 2005) was an English astronomer. He was an early radio astronomer, as well as an optical astronomer. He was best known for his discovery in 1979 of the first example of a gravitational lens, B0957+561, using an optical telescope.

== Personal life ==
He was born into a poor family in Dukinfield, east of Manchester.

He married Pamela Lawton in 1957, with whom he had four sons, named Colin, Timothy, Paul and Brian (the latter three born in the USA). Dr. Walsh taught and also oversaw 16 PhD courses for various students, including one who would later go on herself to teach acclaimed British physicist and maker of documentaries, Brian Cox.

In his last years Dr. Walsh suffered from Lewy body disease. He died at home at the age of 71.

== Career ==
He developed an early aptitude for mathematics and physics. He received a scholarship from the University of Manchester, where he received a first class honours degree in Physics at the age of 19. In 1953 he started studying for a PhD from Jodrell Bank, supervised by Robert Hanbury Brown, where he constructed a 92MHz receiver for the Transit Telescope. Working with Cyril Hazard, he used the receiver to carry out a radio source survey, detecting 134 sources. The survey was limited by source confusion, an issue that Dennis and Cyril identified for the first time.

He completed his PhD in 1957. He worked for Ferranti for a short time, before moving to the University of Michigan in 1959 to teach and to research low-frequency radio emission in the ionosphere, for which he used sounding rockets. He returned to the University of Manchester in 1967 in order to work on atmospheric research using the Ariel 3 satellite, and to lead the "survey group", while supervising PhD students.

He used a wide variety of optical telescopes, having learnt about optical observing using the Isaac Newton Telescope, before being one of the first western astronomers to use the Soviet BTA-6 telescope.

The Jodrell Bank 966MHz survey was led by the survey group at Jodrell Bank. Walsh's spectroscopic follow-up of quasars in this survey led to the 1979 discovery of the first example of a gravitational lens, B0957+561, using an optical telescope at the Kitt Peak National Observatory.

Dr. Walsh was a long-serving council member of the Royal Astronomical Society, where he held the post of Treasurer from 1988 for eight years. He organised the finances for the International Astronomical Union's General Assembly meeting in Manchester in August 2000.
