= Professor of Astrophysics (Cambridge) =

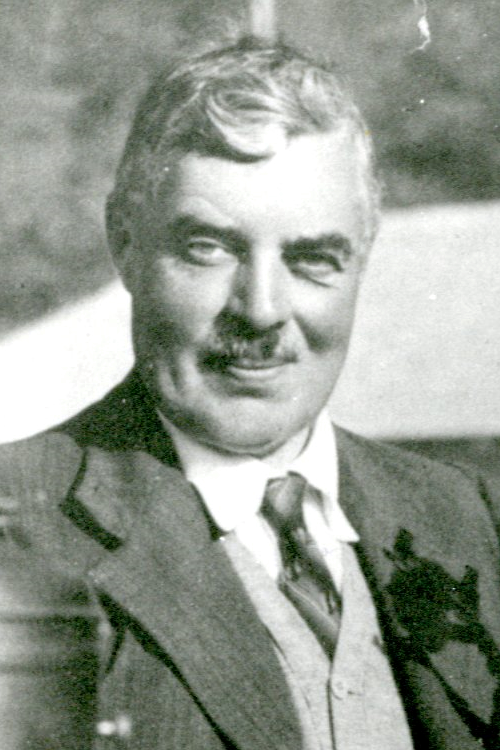
F. J. M. Stratton, Professor of Astrophysics (1909) from 1928 to 1947.
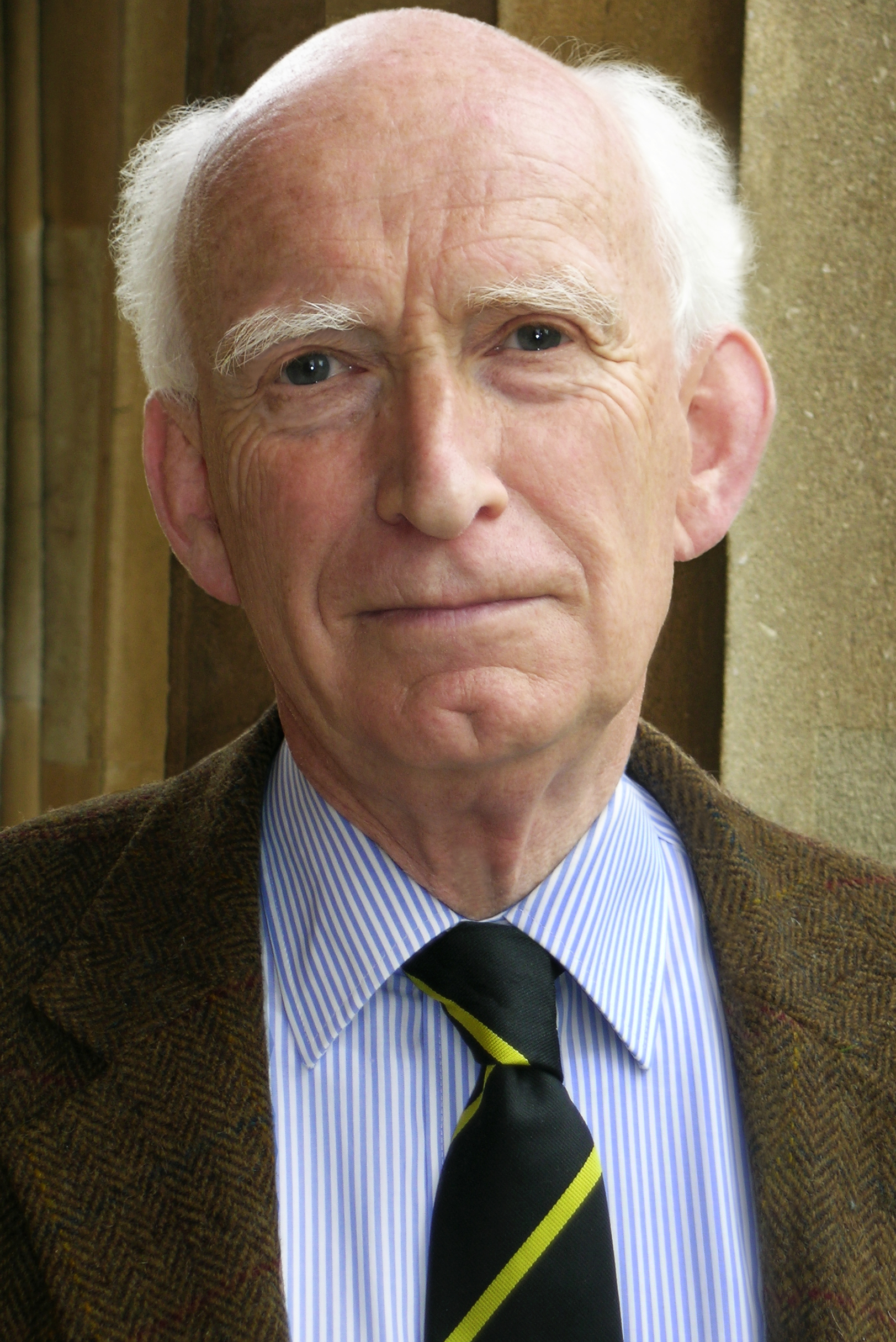
Donald Lynden-Bell, Professor of Astrophysics (1909) from 1971–1997, and Professor of Astrophysics (1997) from 1997 to 2001.

The Professorship of Astrophysics at the University of Cambridge was founded in 1909. It is held by the Institute of Astronomy.

The creation of the 1909 professorship in Cambridge marked the formal recognition of the relatively new subject of Astrophysics. It was without a stipend until 1928, when the first holder Hugh Newall endowed it on his retirement.

In addition to the permanent chair, the university has established five other Professorships of Astrophysics for single tenures (i.e. as personal chairs).

== Professors of Astrophysics (1909) ==
- Hugh Newall (1909–1928)
- F.J.M. Stratton (1928–1947)
- R.O. Redman (1947–1971)
- Donald Lynden-Bell (1971–1997)
- George Efstathiou (1997–2022)
- Hiranya Peiris (2023-)

== Professors of Astrophysics (single-tenure establishments) ==
- Donald Lynden-Bell (1997–2001) – at the Institute of Astronomy
- Neil Wyn Evans (2009–) – at the Institute of Astronomy
- Mike Hobson (2011–) – at the Department of Physics
- Mark Wyatt (2016–) – at the Institute of Astronomy
- Mike Irwin (2018–) – at the Institute of Astronomy
