= Anneila Sargent =

Scottish-American astronomer

Professor Anneila Sargent FRSE
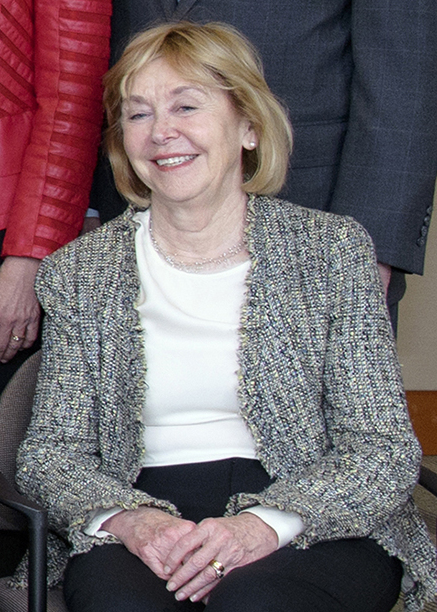
- Sargent at 2017 National Science Board
- Born: Anneila Isabel Cassells; 1942 (age 83–84); Kirkcaldy, Scotland
- Education: University of Edinburgh; University of California, Berkeley; California Institute of Technology
- Spouse: Wallace L. W. Sargent
- Children: 2 daughters
- Awards: NASA Public Service Medal; Caltech Woman of the Year Award; University of Edinburgh Alumnus of the Year (2002)
- Scientific career
- Fields: Star formation, astronomy
- Workplaces: California Institute of Technology

Anneila Isabel Sargent (née Cassells; born 1942) is a Scottish–American astronomer who specializes in star formation.

== Biography ==
Sargent was brought up in Burntisland, Fife, and schooled at Burntisland Primary School and Kirkcaldy High School. She completed a BSc Honors degree in physics at the University of Edinburgh in 1963, and then immigrated to the United States, first studying at the University of California, Berkeley, and then from 1967 at The California Institute of Technology, where she was awarded her Ph.D. in 1977. She is currently the Ira S. Bowen Professor of Astronomy, emeritus at Caltech and has served as director of the Owens Valley Radio Observatory and Combined Array for Research in Millimeter-wave Astronomy. She served as president of the American Astronomical Society from 2000 to 2002, continuing to serve on the council since. She led Caltech's Michelson Science Center from 2000 to 2003. Sargent was the Vice President for Student Affairs at Caltech from 1 December 2007 until 2016.

Sargent was nominated in 2011 by President Obama to serve a six-year term on the National Science Board. She has served on committees such as the NRC Committee for Astronomy and Astrophysics, the NSF Mathematical and Physical Sciences Advisory Committee, and in 1995/6 chaired the Visiting Committee to the National Radio Astronomy Observatory. She has been Chair of NASA's Space Science Advisory Committee since 1994. She is also Director of the Combined Array for Research in Millimeterwave Astronomy (CARMA).

== Research ==
Anneila focuses mainly on researching the early stages of pro stellar evolution as stars develop in the universe. One of her research methods is to use molecular line and dust observations at ,illimeter and sub-millimeter wavelengths to study the structure of the disks that circle around low-mass stars in their developing stages.

== Honors and awards ==
Sargent won both the NASA Public Service Medal and the Caltech Woman of the Year Award in 1998. Asteroid 18244 Anneila is named in her honor. The University of Edinburgh named her Alumnus of the Year in 2002 and conferred an honorary degree of Doctor of Science on her in 2008. Sargent was elected an Honorary Fellow of the Royal Society of Edinburgh in 2017. She was awarded the 2019 Karl G. Jansky Lectureship by Associated Universities, Inc. and the National Radio Astronomy Observatory. The Lectureship is for contributions to radio astronomy, and Sargent was recognized for her "pioneering" work on young stars and the disks from which planets form. She was also honored for her leadership in the astronomical community and her service as a role model for female scientists.

She was elected a Legacy Fellow of the American Astronomical Society in 2020. She was elected to the National Academy of Sciences in 2021.

In the June 2023 Graduation Ceremonies at University of St Andrews, Sargent was awarded Doctor of Science (DSc), in recognition of her major contribution to astronomy.

In 2023, Sargent was elected as a Fellow of the American Association for the Advancement of Science.

== Personal life ==
Her husband was fellow astronomer Wallace L. W. Sargent. She grew up in a home where her father worked in shipyards and her mother had two jobs as a homemaker and was a dressmaker with a little shop.
