= Wallace L. W. Sargent =

American astronomer

Wal Sargent
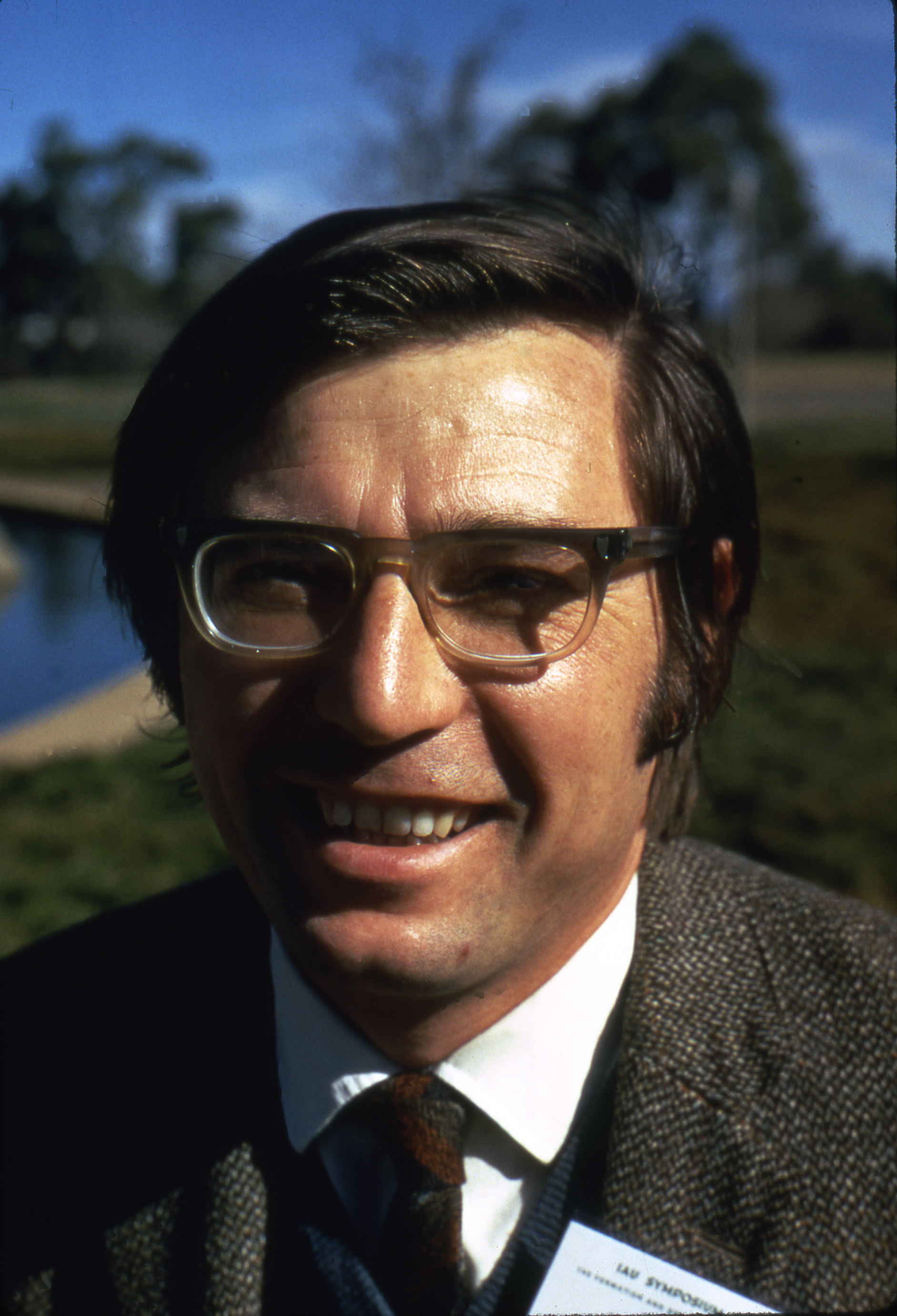
- Sargent in 1973
- Born: Wallace Leslie William Sargent; February 15, 1935; Elsham, Lincolnshire, England
- Died: October 29, 2012 (aged 77); Los Angeles, California, U.S.
- Education: University of Manchester (BSc, PhD)
- Spouse: Anneila Sargent (m. 1964)
- Awards: FRS (1981)
- Scientific career
- Institutions: California Institute of Technology
- Thesis: Some Problems in Cosmical Gas Dynamics (1959)
- Doctoral advisor: Franz Daniel Kahn
- Doctoral students: Alex Filippenko; John Huchra; Charles C. Steidel
- Website: www.astro.caltech.edu/~wws

Wallace Leslie William Sargent FRS (February 15, 1935 – October 29, 2012) was a British-born American astronomer and the Ira S. Bowen Professor of Astronomy at California Institute of Technology.

== Education ==
Sargent was born in Elsham, North Lincolnshire, the son of a gardener and a housecleaner, and grew up in Winterton, Lincolnshire. Sargent was the first person in his family to attend high school, and the first pupil from his high school – Scunthorpe Technical High School – to ever attend university. He received his bachelor's degree from the University of Manchester in 1956, and his Ph.D. in 1959 from the same institution.

== Career and research ==
Sargent spent the majority of his career at California Institute of Technology (Caltech), excepting an absence of four years during which he claims to have had to go back to England to find himself a wife, Anneila Sargent.

Sargent carried out research in many areas of astronomy including stars, galaxies, quasars and active galactic nuclei, quasar absorption lines, and the intergalactic medium. He pioneered the detection of supermassive black holes in galactic nuclei using stellar dynamics, and published the first dynamical measurement of the mass of the black hole in the elliptical galaxy Messier 87.

He supervised the theses of a number of students while at Caltech, including John Huchra, Edwin Turner, Peter J. Young, Charles C. Steidel, and Alex Filippenko.

He was director of the Palomar Observatory from 1997 to 2000.

Donald Lynden-Bell, Roger Griffin, Neville Woolf, and Wal Sargent were in the film Star Men that documented some of their professional accomplishments at their fiftieth reunion to redo a memorable hike. The film also revealed the personalities of these men.

=== Awards and honors ===
- Helen B. Warner Prize for Astronomy (1969)
- Dannie Heineman Prize for Astrophysics (1991)
- Bruce Medal (1994)
- Henry Norris Russell Lectureship (2001)
- Elected a Fellow of the Royal Society (FRS) in 1981
- The Asteroid 11758 Sargent is named in his honor

== Personal life ==
Sargent was married to fellow Caltech astronomer Anneila Sargent from 1964 until his death. Although he became a U.S. citizen, he was born in Elsham, England. He was an atheist.
