= Journal of Cosmology =

Self-published online journal of pseudoscience and fringe science

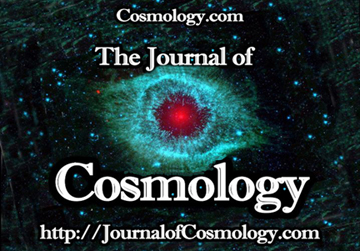
- Peer-reviewed: no; see text
- Language: English
- Edited by: Rudolph Schild

Publication details
- History: 2009–present
- Publisher: Modern Cosmology Associates LLC (United States)

Standard abbreviations
- ISO 4: J. Cosmol.

Indexing
- ISSN: 2159-063X
- LCCN: 2010203854
- OCLC no.: 651009010

Links
- Journal of Cosmology; Journal of Astrobiology

The Journal of Cosmology is a website that describes itself as a "scientific journal". It has been criticized for lacking oversight and proper peer-review, and promoting fringe theories. It was established in 2009 by neuroscientist Rhawn Joseph; as of 2023, Rudolph Schild is the editor-in-chief.

== Scope ==
The Journal of Cosmology is an online publication that contains material on a wide range of subjects in cosmology, astronomy, astrobiology, and Earth and planetary sciences. Writing on biology, geology, physics, chemistry, extinction, the origin and evolution of life, panspermia and Martian colonization and exploration has all been published.

== Reliability ==
The quality of the claimed peer review has been heavily criticized. The website promotes fringe viewpoints and speculative viewpoints on astrobiology, astrophysics, and quantum physics. Skeptical blogger and biologist PZ Myers said that "it isn't a real science journal at all, but [the] website of a small group... obsessed with the idea of Hoyle and Wickramasinghe that life originated in outer space and simply rained down on Earth." It was identified as a predatory journal by Jeffrey Beall.

== History ==
=== Disputes with scientists ===
Scientists who have posted accounts of personal attacks by the journal's staff members include Susan Blackmore, David Brin, and PZ Myers.

=== Hoover paper ===
In early March 2011, a controversy erupted over the publication of a paper by Richard B. Hoover, a retired NASA scientist, with claims of evidence in meteorites that life on Earth could have come from space via debris carrying life from a comet. The website published a dismissal of the criticism as "a barrage of slanderous attacks" from "crackpots and charlatans", calling themesleves courageous for resisting the "terrorists" whose actions they equated with the Inquisition.

NASA distanced itself from Hoover's findings, and issued a statement saying that the paper had been previously submitted in 2007 to International Journal of Astrobiology which did not accept it for review.

On 11 March, in an open letter to the editors of Science and Nature, Schild proposed to establish a commission to investigate the validity of the Hoover paper, which would be led by three experts appointed by Journal of Cosmology, Science and Nature. Schild said he would interpret "any refusal to cooperate, no matter what the excuse" from Nature or Science as "vindication for the Journal of Cosmology and the Hoover paper, and an acknowledgment that the editorial policies of the Journal of Cosmology are beyond reproach". Schild subsequently issued another statement standing by their publication process and suggesting that criticisms were "slander and histrionic tirades", and comparing their critics to "lunatics... unleashed to throw filth", suggesting that their own actions were part of a 2000-year struggle of science against religion. Since their critics had "refused to cooperate" in a review, they reaffirmed the study to be "beyond reproach".

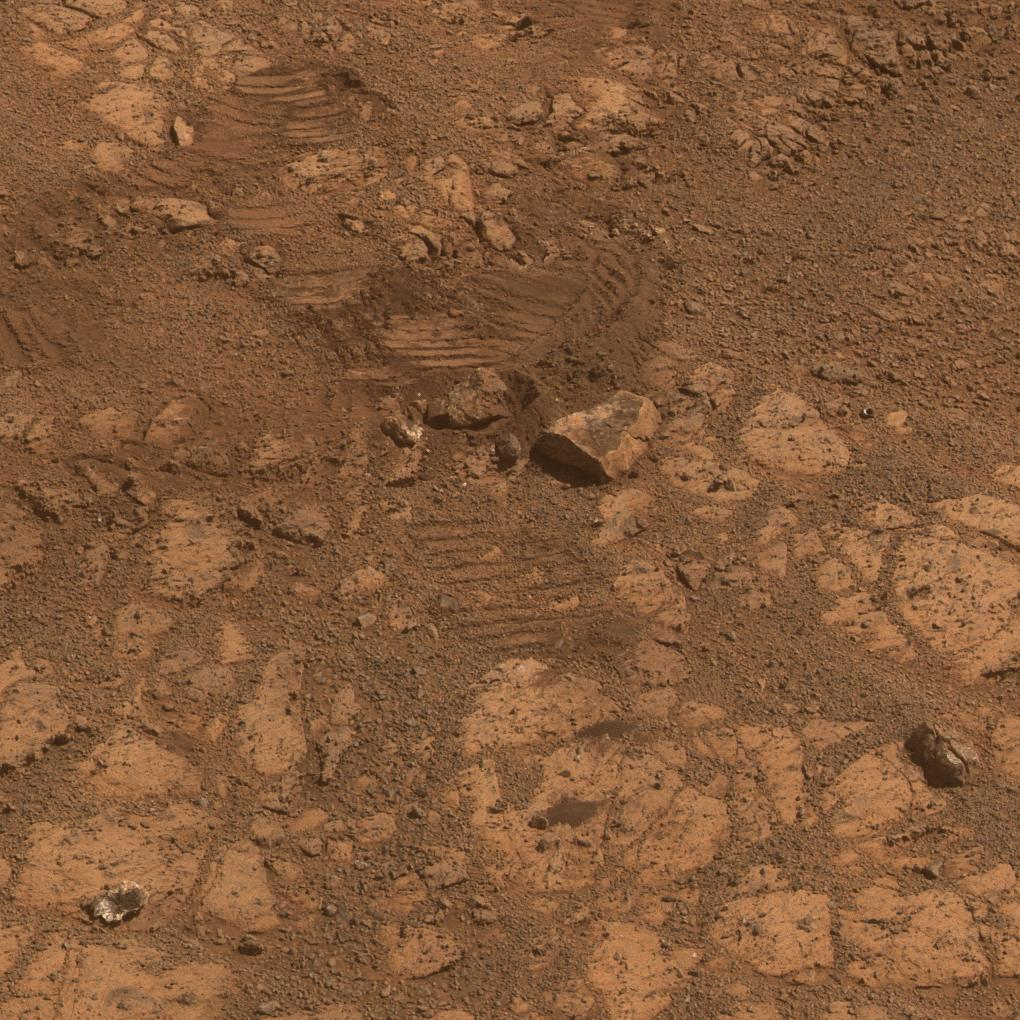
Location where "Pinnacle Island" rock was dislodged by the Opportunity rover

The James Randi Educational Foundation awarded Hoover the tongue-in-cheek Pigasus Award, for repeatedly announcing, "[a]long with the crackpot Journal of Cosmology", widely dismissed claims that he had found signs of life in Mars rocks.

=== NASA lawsuit ===
On 17 January 2014, NASA reported that a Martian rock, named "Pinnacle Island", that was not in an Opportunity rover image taken on Sol 3528, "mysteriously" appeared 13 days later in a similar image taken on Sol 3540. One possible explanation, presented by Steven Squyres, principal investigator of the Mars Exploration Rover Mission, was that the rover, in one of its turning motions, flicked the rock from a few feet away and into the new location. In response to the finding, Rhawn Joseph published an article on the website on 17 January 2014, concluding that the object is in fact a living organism resembling apothecia. Joseph then filed a writ of mandamus on 27 January 2014 in San Francisco Federal Court, demanding that NASA examine the rock more closely.

NASA had already examined the rock on 8 January 2014 and confirmed it was a rock with a high sulphur, manganese, and magnesium content. According to Squyres, "We have looked at it with our microscope. It is clearly a rock." On 14 February 2014, NASA released an image showing the location from where the "Pinnacle Island" rock was dislodged by the Opportunity rover.
