= Alison E. Rose =

Canadian director, writer and producer

- Occupations: Director, Writer, Producer

Alison E. Rose is a Canadian director, writer, and producer from Markdale, Ontario. Since 2003, she has released three documentaries: Galileo's Sons (2003), Love at the Twilight Hotel (2009), and Star Men (2014). Rose has won and been nominated for several awards

including, a Gemini award for Galileo's Sons, which she won in 2004, and the Order of Ontario, which she received in 2012.

== Personal life ==
Alison E. Rose was born in Emo, Ontario, in the Rainy River District north of the Minnesota border. She has degrees in journalism and political science and she is a national newspaper and national magazine award-winning writer. She created her own production company, Inigo Films, in 2001. Rose also volunteers, helping to feed the hungry in Toronto, Ontario. Rose describes giving back as a "gift." "It anchors my week, it provides structure in my life that would otherwise be lacking because I'm self-employed and somewhat undisciplined...it gives me people to care about...I've always wanted to help."

== Career ==
Rose created Inigo Films in 2001. She made the Gemini award-winning Galileo's Sons (2003), a documentary about the Vatican Observatory. The film explored the history of the Jesuits and their relation to astrophysicists, as well as, the rivalry between science and religion centering around the trial of Galileo.

In 2009, Rose completed work on her second documentary, Love at the Twilight Hotel. Set in motels along the infamous Little Havana strip in Miami, Florida, the film interviews men and women who had encounters with drug deals, prostitution, and robbery in the motels. Rose spent three years making the film, staying in motels and meeting men and women who frequented the area.

In June 2015, Rose released Star Men, a documentary that follows a reunion of four astronomers as they embark on a nostalgic road trip in the American Southwest. Donald Lynden-Bell, Roger Griffin, Wal Sargent and Neville Woolf are the subjects of the film. After earning their PhDs in England, they went on to do post-doctoral research in California in 1960/61 and the four explored the Western United States on holidays. Rose's Star Men depicts a reunion of such a journey almost fifty years later. Rather than concentrate solely on the scientific process, Star Men depicts the passion the scientists have for their work. Aging is another theme the film explores; the astronomers, all in their twilight years, confront physical deficiency and terminal illness, with Wal Sargent dying seven months after the reunion.

== Awards ==
- National Magazine Award, Gold (1997), Science & Technology writing
- National Newspaper Award, Arts & Entertainment writing (2002)
- Gemini Award (2004)
- Order of Ontario (2011)
- Diamond Jubilee Medal (2012)

== Filmography ==
- Galileo's Sons (2003)
- Love at the Twilight Hotel (2009)
- Star Men (2015)
