= Rudolph Schild =

American astrophysicist (born 1940)

Rudolph E. Schild (born 10 January 1940) is an astrophysicist at the Harvard-Smithsonian Center for Astrophysics, who has been active since the mid-1960s. He has authored or contributed to over 250 papers, of which 150 are in refereed journals.

== Career ==
Schild's research in the 1980s and '90s was focused on using gravitational lensing to determine the age of the universe and the Hubble constant. The investigation into quasar images also, in 1994, suggested the existence of a binary pair of stars within a few light years of Earth. He also published in 1996 his findings on rogue planets identified through analysis of Hubble Space Telescope images. Then, in the 2000s, Schild began focusing on the double galaxy CSL-1 and superstring theory, which was noted as a possible step toward uncovering the theory of everything.

Schild is a member of a group of researchers who have published frequently on the claim that photos on Mars from various NASA rover missions have shown evidence of fossilized life. He is a proponent of "magnetospheric eternally collapsing objects" (MECOs), an alternative to black holes. These results are most often published in Journal of Cosmology, a fringe astronomy journal edited by Schild himself, while his other research is published in mainstream astronomy journals such as MNRAS and the Astronomical Journal.

== Personal life ==
Schild is married to mezzo-soprano Jane Struss, who teaches voice at Longy School of Music.
