= Magnetospheric eternally collapsing object =

Alternative model for black holes

The magnetospheric eternally collapsing object (MECO) is an alternative model for black holes initially proposed by Indian scientist Abhas Mitra in 1998 and later generalized by American researchers Darryl J. Leiter and Stanley L. Robertson. A proposed observable difference between MECOs and black holes is that a MECO can produce its own intrinsic magnetic field. An uncharged black hole cannot produce its own magnetic field, though its accretion disk can.

== Theoretical model ==
In the theoretical model a MECO begins to form in much the same way as a black hole, with a large amount of matter collapsing inward toward a single point. However, as it becomes smaller and denser, a MECO does not form an event horizon.

As the matter becomes denser and hotter, it glows more brightly. Eventually its interior approaches the Eddington limit. At this point the internal radiation pressure is sufficient to slow the inward collapse almost to a standstill.

In fact, the collapse gets slower and slower, so a singularity could only form in an infinite future. Unlike a black hole, the MECO never fully collapses. Rather, according to the model it slows down and enters an eternal collapse.

Mitra provides a review of the evolution of black hole alternatives including his model of eternal collapse and MECOs.

=== Eternal collapse ===
Mitra's paper claiming non-occurrence of event horizons and exact black holes later appeared in Pramana - Journal of Physics. In this paper, Mitra proposes that so-called black holes are eternally collapsing while Schwarzschild black holes have a gravitational mass M = 0. He argued that all proposed black holes are instead quasi-black holes rather than exact black holes and that during the gravitational collapse to a black hole, the entire mass energy and angular momentum of the collapsing objects is radiated away before formation of exact mathematical black holes. Mitra proposes that in his formulation since a mathematical zero-mass black hole requires infinite proper time to form, continued gravitational collapse becomes eternal, and the observed black hole candidates must instead be eternally collapsing objects (ECOs). For physical realization of this, he argued that in an extremely relativistic regime, continued collapse must be slowed to a near halt by radiation pressure at the Eddington limit.

=== Magnetic field ===
A MECO can carry electric and magnetic properties, has a finite size, can carry angular momentum and rotate.

== Observational evidence ==
Astronomer Rudolph Schild of the Harvard–Smithsonian Center for Astrophysics claimed in 2006 to have found evidence consistent with an intrinsic magnetic field from the black hole candidate in the quasar Q0957+561. Chris Reynolds of the University of Maryland has criticised the MECO interpretation, suggesting instead that the apparent hole in the disc could be filled with very hot, tenuous gas, which would not radiate much and would be hard to see; however, Leiter in turn questions the viability of Reynolds's interpretation.

== Reception of the MECO model ==
Mitra's hypothesis that black holes cannot form is based in part on the argument that in order for a black hole to form, the collapsing matter must travel faster than the speed of light with respect to a fixed observer. In 2002, Paulo Crawford and Ismael Tereno cited this as an example of a "wrong and widespread view", and explain that in order for a frame of reference to be valid, the observer must be moving along a timelike worldline. At or inside the event horizon of a black hole, it is not possible for such an observer to remain fixed; all observers are drawn toward the black hole. Mitra argues that he has proven that the world-line of an in-falling test particle would tend to be lightlike at the event horizon, independent of the definition of "velocity".

== See also ==
- Apparent horizon
- Firewall paradox
- Planck star
- No-hair theorem
