= NGC 4151 =

Galaxy in the constellation Canes Venatici

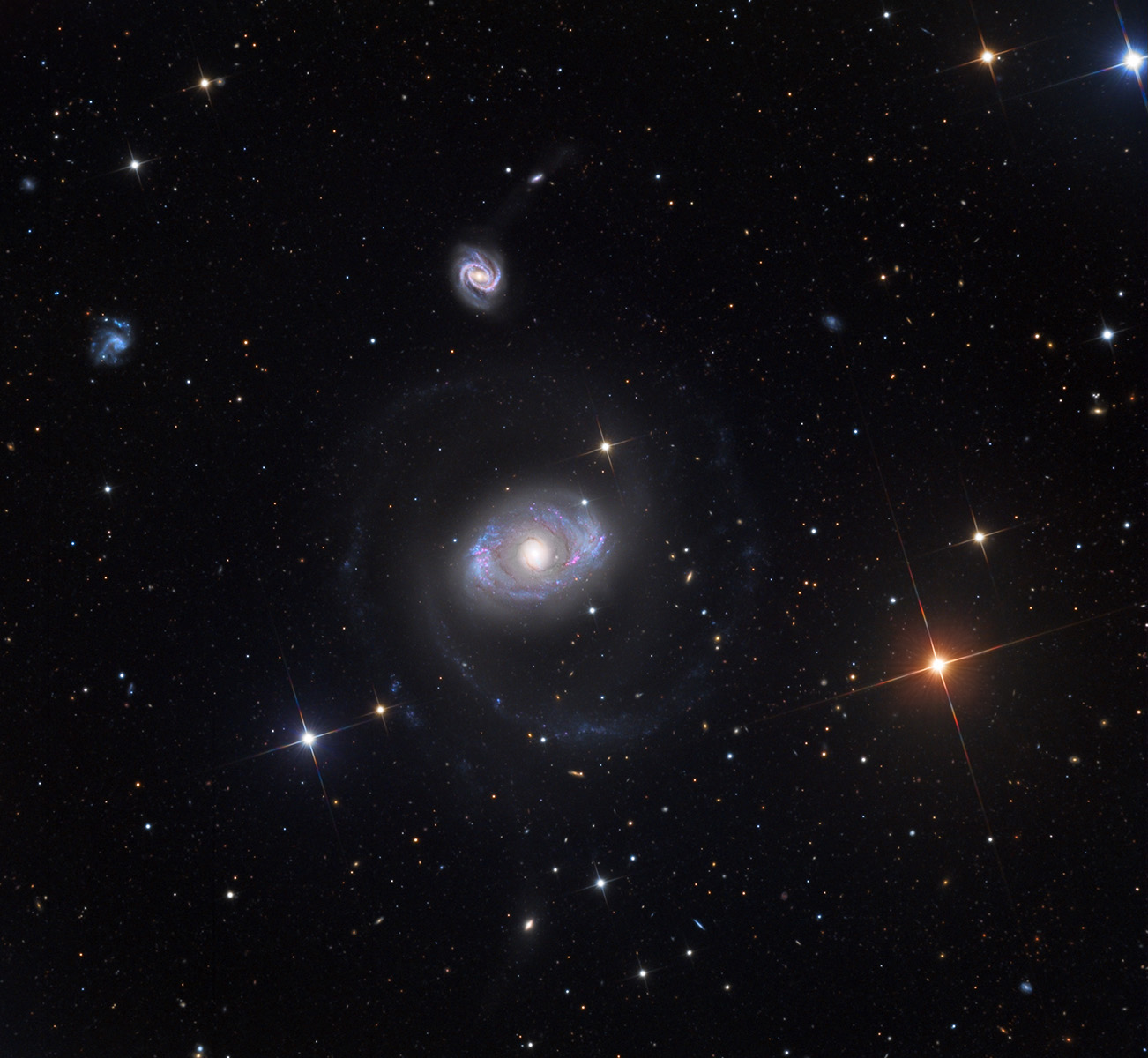
- Image of NGC 4151 from the 0.8m Schulman Telescope at the Mount Lemmon SkyCenter

Observation data (J2000 epoch)
- Constellation: Canes Venatici
- Right ascension: 12^{h} 10^{m} 32.6^{s}
- Declination: +39° 24′ 21″
- Redshift: 0.003262
- Heliocentric radial velocity: 995 ± 3 km/s
- Distance: 51.5 ± 1.3 Mly (15.8 ± 0.4 Mpc)
- Apparent magnitude (V): 10.8

Characteristics
- Type: (R')SAB(rs)ab, Sy1
- Size: ~54,300 ly (16.66 kpc) (estimated)
- Apparent size (V): 6.8′ × 5.3′

Other designations
- NGC 4515, UGC 7166, PGC 38739

NGC 4151 is an intermediate spiral Seyfert galaxy with weak inner ring structure located 15.8 megaparsecs (52 million light-years) from Earth in the constellation Canes Venatici. The galaxy was first mentioned by William Herschel on March 17, 1787. It was one of the six galaxies described in Carl Seyfert's original paper which defined such systems. It is one of the nearest galaxies to Earth to contain an actively growing supermassive black hole. The black hole would have a mass on the order of 2.5 million to 30 million solar masses. It was speculated that the nucleus may host a binary black hole, with about 40 million and about 10 million solar masses respectively, orbiting with a 15.8-year period. This is, however, still a matter of active debate.

Some astronomers nickname it the "Eye of Sauron" from its appearance.

NGC 4151 is a member of a group of 9 galaxies known as the NGC 4151 Group. The NGC 4151 Group is part of the Ursa Major Cloud, which is part of the Virgo Supercluster.

== Supernova ==
One supernova has been observed in NGC 4151: SN 2018aoq (Type II-P, mag 15.3) was discovered by the Lick Observatory Supernova Search (LOSS) on 1 April 2018.

== X-ray source ==
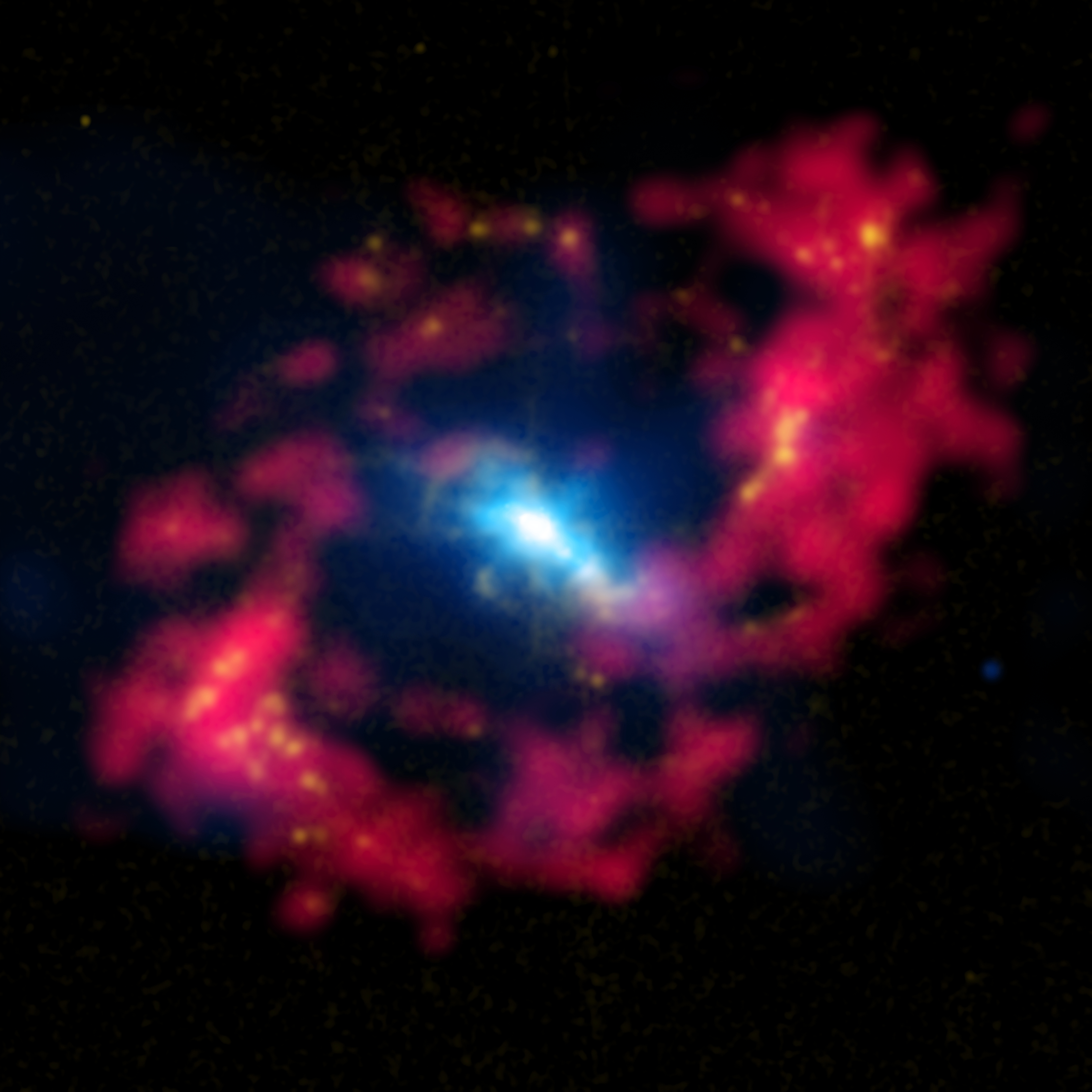
NGC 4151. X-rays (blue), optical data (yellow), radio observation (red)

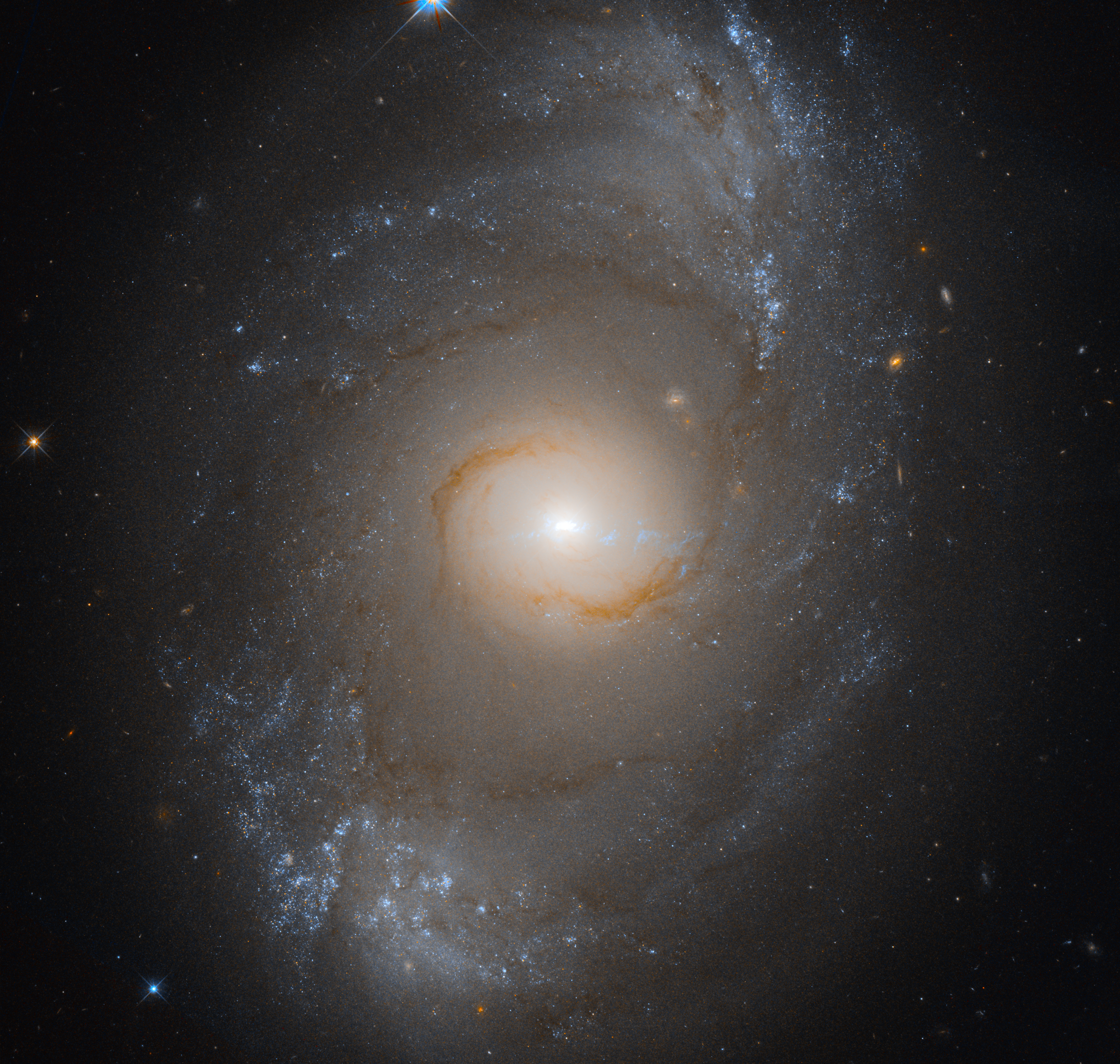
NGC 4151, by HST (WFC3).

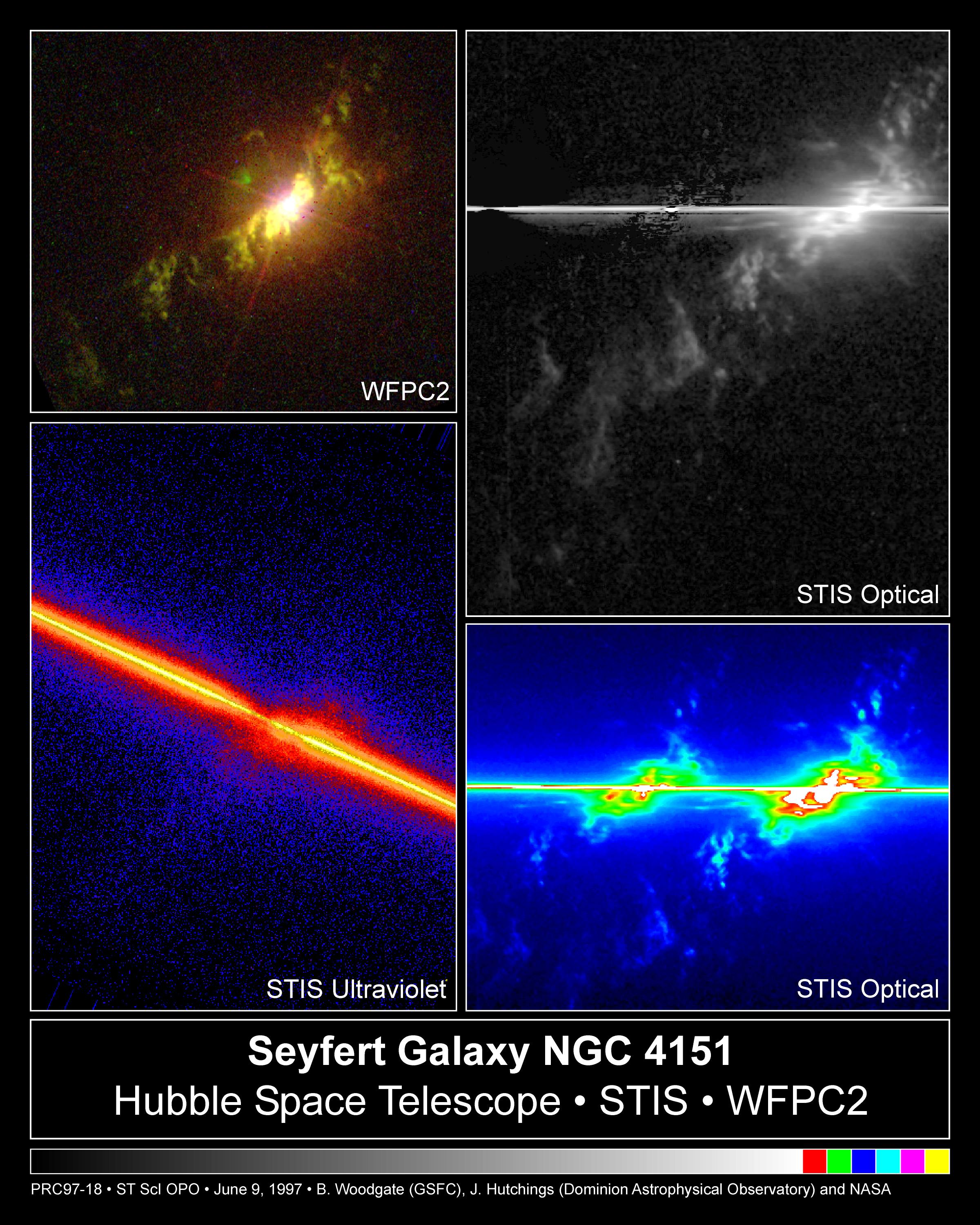
Optical and ultraviolet images of the black hole in the center of NGC 4151

Astronomers using data from the European Space Agency's XMM-Newton satellite have found a long-sought X-ray signal from NGC 4151. When the black hole's X-ray source flares, its accretion disk reflects the emission about half an hour later.

X-ray emission from NGC 4151 was apparently first detected on December 24, 1970, with the X-ray observatory satellite Uhuru, although the observation spanned an error-box of 0.56 square degrees and there is some controversy as to whether UHURU might not have detected the BL Lac object 1E 1207.9 +3945, which is inside their error box – the later HEAO 1 detected an X-ray source of NGC 4151 at 1H 1210+393, coincident with the optical position of the nucleus and outside the error box of Uhuru.

To explain the X-ray emission two different possibilities have been proposed:

- radiation of material falling onto the central black hole (which was growing much more quickly about 25,000 years ago) was so bright that it stripped electrons away from the atoms in the gas in its path, and then electrons recombined with these ionized atoms
- the energy released by material flowing into the black hole in an accretion disk created a vigorous outflow of gas from the surface of the disk, which directly heated gas in its path to X-ray emitting temperatures

== See also ==
- X-ray astronomy
