= Donald Lynden-Bell =

British theoretical astrophysicist (1935–2018)

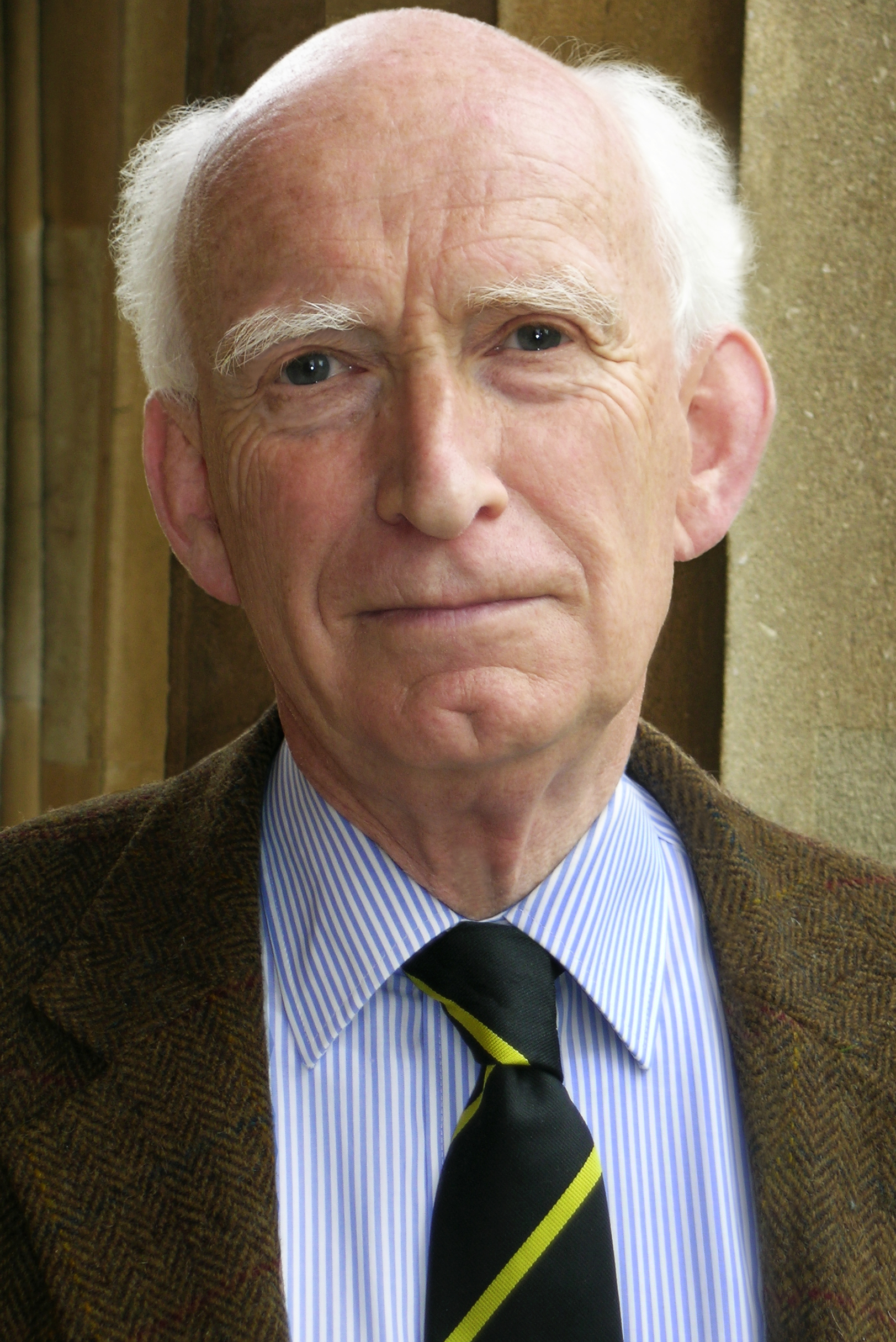
- Lynden-Bell in 2008
- Born: 5 April 1935; Dover, United Kingdom
- Died: 6 February 2018 (aged 82); Cambridge, United Kingdom
- Education: University of Cambridge
- Awards: Karl Schwarzschild Medal (1983) Eddington Medal (1984); Brouwer Award (1991); Gold Medal of the Royal Astronomical Society (1993); Bruce Medal (1998); John J. Carty Award for the Advancement of Science (2000); Henry Norris Russell Lectureship (2000) Kavli Prize for Astrophysics (2008)
- Scientific career
- Fields: Astrophysics
- Workplaces: University of Cambridge
- Thesis: Stellar and galactic dynamics (1961)
- Doctoral advisor: Leon Mestel
- Doctoral students: Ofer Lahav; Somak Raychaudhury; Simon White
- Other notable students: Douglas N. C. Lin

Donald Lynden-Bell CBE FRS (5 April 1935 – 6 February 2018) was a British theoretical astrophysicist. He was the first to determine that galaxies contain supermassive black holes at their centres, and that such black holes power quasars. Lynden-Bell was President of the Royal Astronomical Society (1985–1987) and received numerous awards for his work, including the inaugural Kavli Prize for Astrophysics. He worked at the University of Cambridge for his entire career, where he was the first director of its Institute of Astronomy.

== Biography ==
Lynden-Bell was born at Dover Castle in Dover, Kent, into a military family, as one of two children to Lachlan Arthur Lynden-Bell (1897–1984) and Monica Rose Thring (1906–1994). His father, a lieutenant colonel, fought on the Western Front and in the Middle East during World War I and had received a Military Cross. He had a sister, Jean Monica, who became a prominent music teacher in Canada.

He attended Marlborough College before being admitted to Clare College, Cambridge in 1953. After earning a distinction in the Mathematical Tripos, Lynden-Bell went on to doctoral studies in theoretical astronomy working with Leon Mestel, which he completed in 1960. In 1962, he published research with Olin Eggen and Allan Sandage arguing that the Milky Way originated through the dynamic collapse of a single large gas cloud. In 1969 he published his theory that quasars are powered by massive black holes accreting material. From counting dead quasars, he deduced that most massive galaxies have black holes at their centres.

Lynden-Bell developed a theory for the relaxation of a system of particles in changing potential field known as "violent relaxation." Violent relaxation has many applications in dynamical astronomy, affecting the orbits of stars within star clusters and galaxies. Lynden-Bell is also known for the development of the theory of the gravothermal catastrophe, a phenomenon in star clusters that is the result of the negative heat capacity of gravitational systems. The catastrophe occurs when the core of a cluster shrinks and heats up, causing it to transfer energy to stars in the cluster's halo, leading the cluster core to collapse.

Lynden-Bell authored an influential 1974 paper with James E. Pringle about the evolution of disks around "nebular variables," which were later to become known as T Tauri stars – an early phase in a star's life cycle. The paper predicts the signature of radiation from such disks, which is emitted primarily at infrared wavelengths where it dominates over the emission from the star. Excess infrared emission from young stars has become one of the primary methods used to identify these objects in astronomical surveys.

In 1971, he became Professor of Astrophysics (1909) and later the first director of the Institute of Astronomy, Cambridge, when it formed from the merger of the Institute of Theoretical Astrophysics and the Cambridge Observatories in 1972.

In the 1980s, he was a member of a group of astronomers known as the 'Seven Samurai' (with Sandra Faber, David Burstein, Alan Dressler, Roger Davies, Roberto Terlevich, and Gary A. Wegner) who postulated the existence of the Great Attractor, a huge, diffuse region of material around 250 million light-years away that results in the observed motion of our local galaxies.

Lynden-Bell, Roger Griffin, Neville Woolf, and Wallace L. W. Sargent were in the 2015 documentary film Star Men that covered some of their professional accomplishments at their fiftieth reunion to redo a memorable hike.

His research in the last years of his life mainly focused on astrophysical jets and general relativity.

== Personal life and death ==
Donald was married to Ruth Lynden-Bell, a professor of chemistry at the University of Cambridge, on 1 July 1961.

Lynden-Bell died at his home in Cambridge on 6 February 2018, at the age of 82. He had a stroke in the months preceding his death, and never fully recovered. Responding to news of his death, John Zarnecki, then President of the Royal Astronomical Society, praised Lynden-Bell's contributions to astronomy, particularly his "incisive questions at scientific meetings and being generous in his support for others".

== Honours ==
=== Awards ===
- Karl Schwarzschild Medal (1983)
- Eddington Medal (1984)
- Brouwer Award of the American Astronomical Society, Division for Dynamical Astronomy (1991)
- Gold Medal of the Royal Astronomical Society (1993)
- Bruce Medal (1998)
- National Academy of Sciences, John J. Carty Award for the Advancement of Science (2000)
- Henry Norris Russell Lectureship (2000)
- The first Kavli Prize for Astrophysics (2008), with Maarten Schmidt
- Member of the Norwegian Academy of Science and Letters.

=== Named after him ===
- Asteroid 18235 Lynden-Bell
