= Cloverleaf quasar =

Rare example of a quadruply-lensed quasar

Cloverleaf, H1413+117, QSO 1415+1129
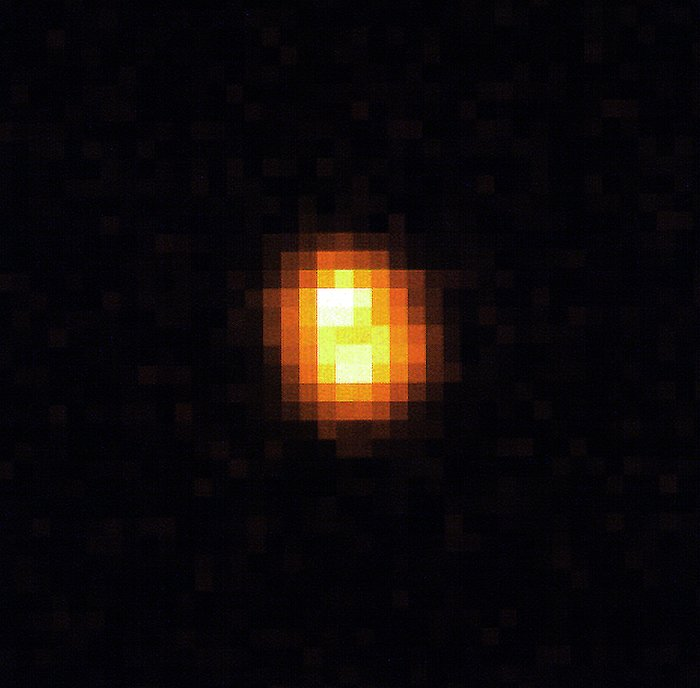
- ESO image of the Cloverleaf quasar

Observation data (Epoch J2000)
- Right ascension: 14 ^{h} 15 ^{m} 46.27 ^{s}
- Declination: +11° 29 ′ 43.4 ″
- Redshift: 2.56
- Distance: 11 Gly
- Apparent magnitude (V): 17
- Notable features: Four-image lens, bright CO emission

Other designations
- QSO J1415+1129, QSO B1413+1143, H 1413+117, Clover Leaf Quasar

The Cloverleaf quasar (H1413+117, QSO J1415+1129) is a bright, gravitationally lensed quasar discovered by Hazard, Morton, Terlevich and McMahon in 1984. It receives its name because of gravitational lensing splitting the single quasar into four images. Gravitational lensing of the quasar H1413+1011 was discovered in Magain et al. in 1988, which found that the quasar's light was split by gravitational lensing by a foreground galaxy into four images gave it the name "Cloverleaf quasar".

== Quasar ==
Molecular gas (notably CO) detected in the host galaxy associated with the quasar is the oldest molecular material known and provides evidence of large-scale star formation in the early universe. Thanks to the strong magnification provided by the foreground lens, the Cloverleaf is the brightest known source of CO emission at high redshift and was also the first source at a redshift z = 2.56 to be detected with HCN or HCO^{+} emission. This suggests the quasar is currently undergoing an intense wave of star formations thus increasing its luminosity. A radio jet has also been found on the side of quasar according to a study published in 2023.

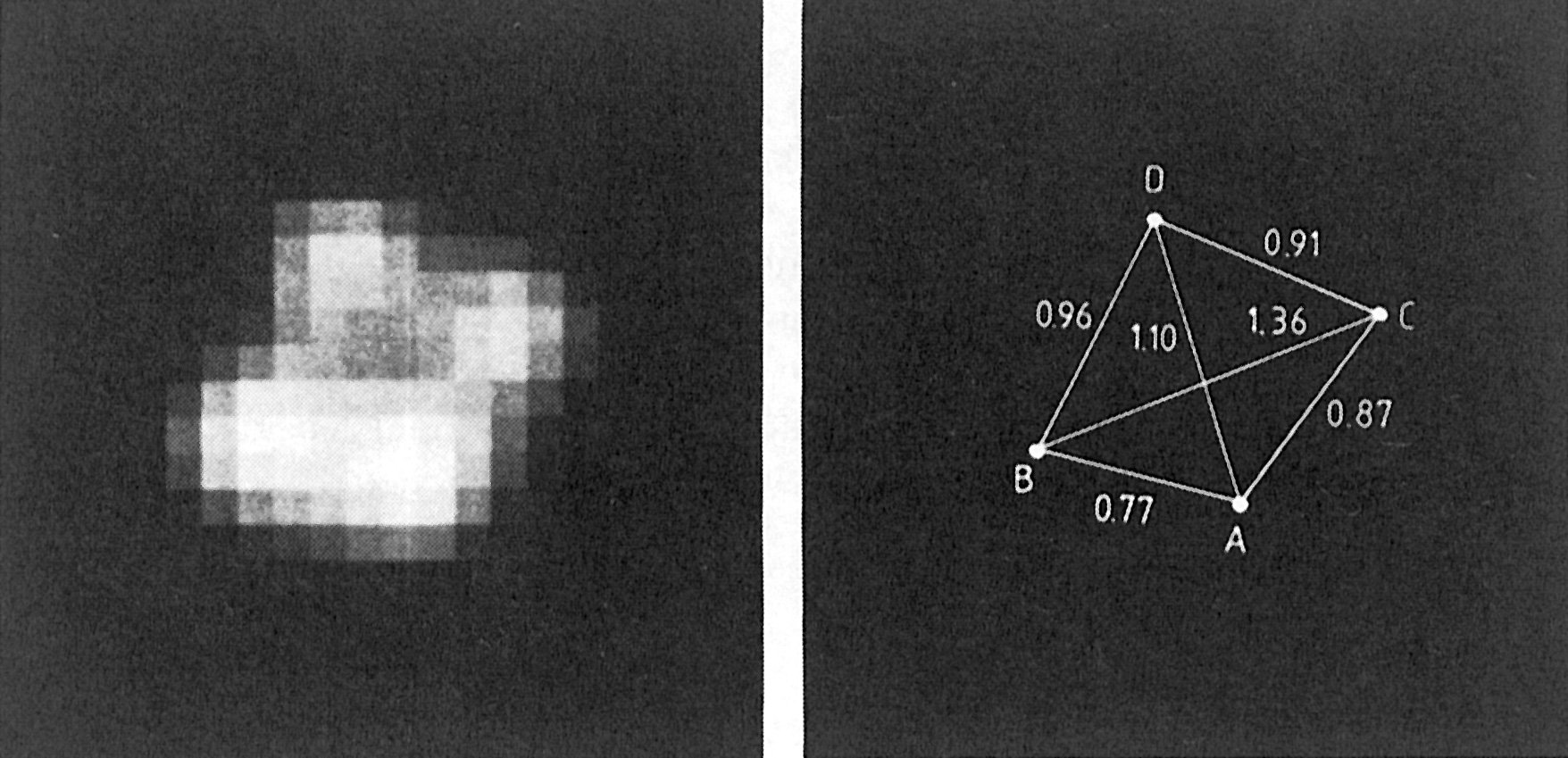
CCD image of the Cloverleaf quasar taken in March 1988 by the ESO/MPI 2.2m telescope. The four separated images are part of the quasar.

The 4 quasar images were originally discovered in 1984; in 1988, they were determined to be a single quasar split into four images, instead of 4 separate quasars. The X-rays from iron atoms were also enhanced relative to X-rays at lower energies. Since the amount of brightening due to gravitational lensing doesn't vary with the wavelength, this means that an additional object has magnified the X-rays. The increased magnification of the X-ray light can be explained by gravitational microlensing, an effect which has been used to search for compact stars and planets in our galaxy. Microlensing occurs when a star or a multiple star system passes in front of light from a background object. If a single star or a multiple star system in one of the foreground galaxies passed in front of the light path for the brightest image, then that image would be selectively magnified.

=== Black hole ===
The X-rays would be magnified much more than the visible light if they came from a region around the central supermassive black hole of the lensing galaxy that was smaller than the origin region of the visible light. The enhancement of the X-rays from iron ions would be due to this same effect. The analysis indicates that the X-rays are coming from a very small region, about the size of the Solar System, around the central black hole. The visible light is coming from a region ten or more times larger. The angular size of these regions at a distance of 11 billion light years is tens of thousands times smaller than the smallest region that can be resolved by the Hubble Space Telescope. This provides a way to test models for the flow of gas around a supermassive black hole. Additionally, inner regions of the quasar's accretion disk around the black hole has been detected suggesting outflow wind.

=== Lensing galaxy and partial Einstein ring ===
Data from NICMOS and a special algorithm resolved the lensing galaxy and a partial Einstein ring. The Einstein ring represents the host galaxy of the lensed quasar.

== History ==
The Cloverleaf quasar was discovered in 1988. Data on the Cloverleaf collected by the Chandra X-ray Observatory in 2004 were compared with that gathered by optical telescopes. One of the X-ray components (A) in the Cloverleaf is brighter than the others in both optical and X-ray light but was found to be relatively brighter in X-ray than in optical light. The X-rays from iron atoms were also enhanced relative to X-rays at lower energies.

== Gallery ==
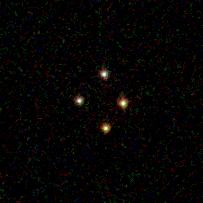
Quadruple image of the quasar taken with Hubble Space Telescope.

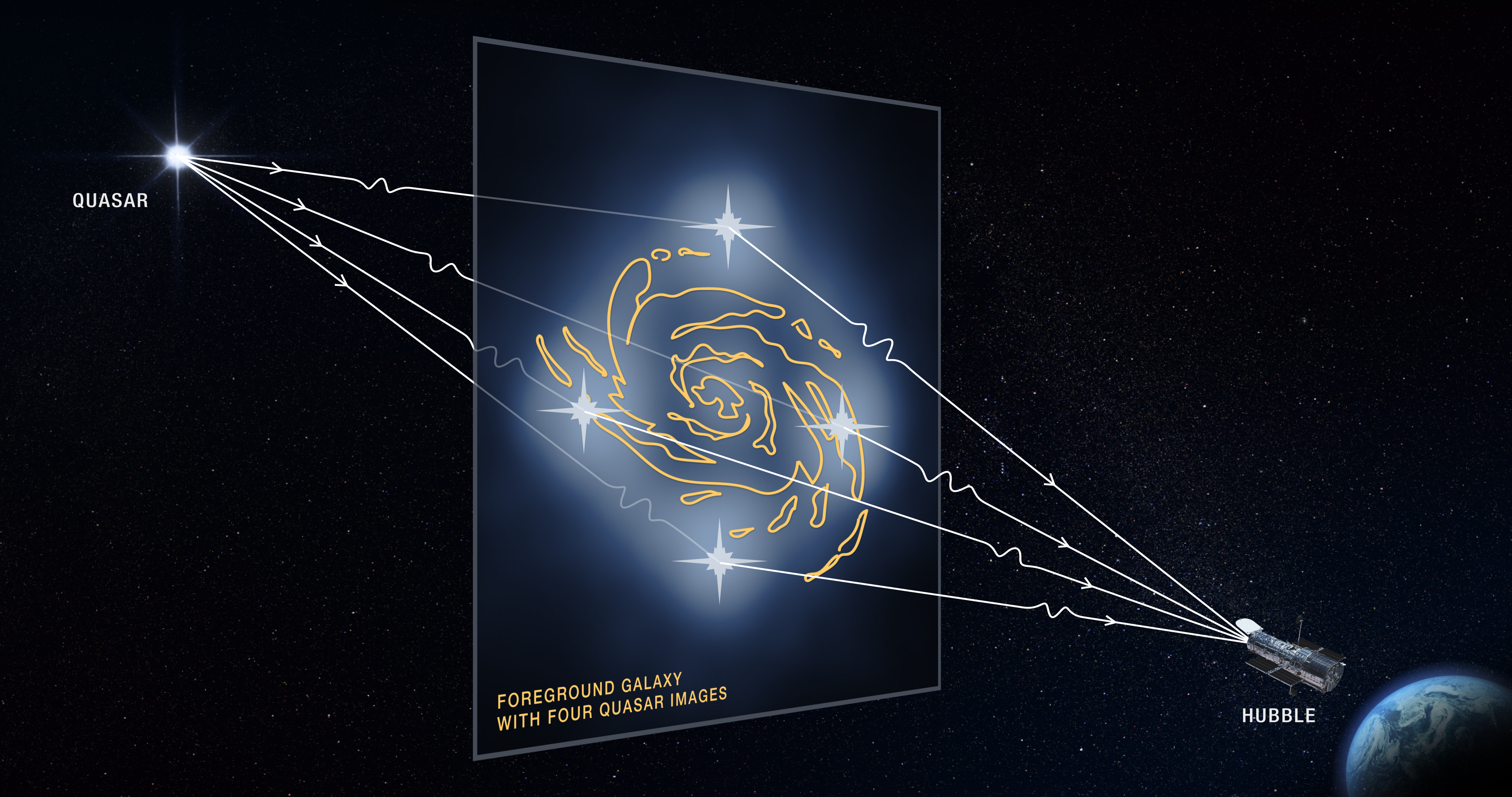
Graphic illustration of four images of the quasar caused by gravitational lensing.

== See also ==
- List of quasars
