= John Gatenby Bolton =

British-Australian astronomer (1922–1993)

John Bolton FAA FRS CBE
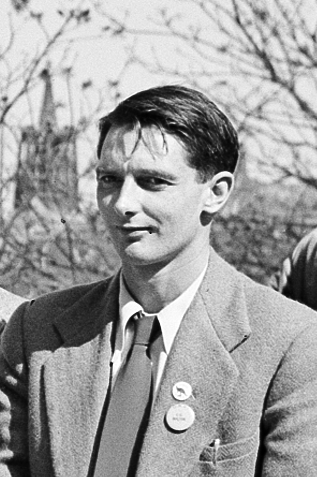
- Born: John Gatenby Bolton; 5 June 1922; Sheffield, Yorkshire, England
- Died: 3 July 1993 (aged 71); Buderim, Queensland, Australia
- Education: University of Cambridge
- Known for: Radio astronomy; Parkes Radio Telescope
- Awards: Gold Medal of the Royal Astronomical Society; Bruce Medal
- Scientific career
- Fields: Astronomy, physics
- Workplaces: CSIRO; Caltech; Telecommunications Research Establishment
- Notable students: Ronald Ekers; Kenneth Kellermann; Robert Woodrow Wilson

John Gatenby Bolton FAA FRS CBE (5 June 1922 – 6 July 1993) was a British-Australian astronomer who was fundamental to the development of radio astronomy. In particular, Bolton was integral in establishing that discrete radio sources were either galaxies or the remnants of supernovae, rather than stars. He also played a significant role in the discovery of quasars and the centre of the Milky Way. Bolton served as the inaugural director of the Parkes radio telescope in Australia and established the Owens Valley Radio Observatory in California. Bolton's students held directorships at most of the radio observatories in the world and one was a Nobel Prize winner. Bolton is considered a key figure in the development of astronomy in Australia.

== Early life ==
John Gatenby Bolton was born in Sheffield, United Kingdom, in 1922 to two high school teachers. While suffering from various sicknesses in his youth, such as severe asthma and migraines, Bolton showed an early interest and proficiency in sports, mathematics, and science. He was awarded a scholarship to the secondary King Edward VII School, but his family was required to pay full fees since his father's salary was above the threshold of the means-tested scholarship. At King Edward VII School, he was elected prefect and was awarded the school's mathematics prize in his final year. His upbringing is considered middle-class for the 1920s and 1930s United Kingdom.

Bolton was awarded a place to study pure mathematics and natural philosophy at Trinity College, Cambridge in 1940, and two scholarships to cover his fees and living expenses. Due to World War 2, his degree was reduced from three to two years. In his second year, Bolton decided to focus on physics rather than mathematics. He completed his degree in May 1942 with second-class honours. While an average result for a student that had previously finished in top third of his cohort, his mother had deteriorated and died during Bolton's examination period.

== World War 2 and radar work ==
Bolton enlisted with the military after completing his final examinations, and chose the Navy due to his love of ships. He was commissioned as a sub-lieutenant in the Royal Navy Volunteer Reserve. While at officer training at HMNB Portsmouth he chose to do research and development of airborne radar.

Bolton's experience of radar during World War 2 would establish key relationships and experiences that would heavily influence his future radio astronomy career. Bolton's first war posting saw him responsible for two coastal radar stations and testing the latest radar sets in night fighters. At the end of 1942, Bolton was transferred to the Telecommunications Research Establishment, the headquarters of Britain's wartime radar research and development. At this location he met many of what would be many of the leaders of the post-war radio astronomy efforts, including Martin Ryle.

At the Telecommunications Research Establishment, Bolton first worked on developing a new airborne radar system operating at a wavelength of 3 cm, which included extensive testing during flights. By the time of the D-day landing, Bolton had grown tired of inflight testing radar. He was offered a position as radio officer on the British light aircraft carrier HMS Unicorn. Such a position made Bolton responsible for all airborne electronics, ship-to-aircraft communications, and navigational aids. As a support ship, Unicorn had a reasonably safe war experience, with no major damage reported. Bolton's experience on Unicorn is credited with developing his hands-on expertise with electronics and the ideas that would help him later to build a sea-cliff interferometer.

As World War 2 ended in 1945, HMS Unicorn shuttled cargo and personnel in the Pacific theatre back to Australia. When Unicorn returned to Britain in December 1945, Bolton decided to remain in Sydney. The choice to make Australia his new home was largely due to the positive influence the climate had on his health but also because his application to enrol in postgraduate studies at the Cavendish Laboratory at Cambridge University had been rejected. His abbreviated wartime undergraduate degree was deemed inadequate training for postgraduate study by the head of the Cavendish Laboratory, Lawrence Bragg.

== CSIR, Cygnus, and the sea-cliff interferometer ==
After leaving the Navy, Bolton searched for a job through his Navy connections in Australia. Through one government official associated with finding work for veterans, an appointment was made for Bolton to meet Taffy Bowen, the head of Radiophysics Laboratory of CSIR. Bolton was soon appointed to the new research officer position, with duties of `research and development in connection with the application of radar techniques'. The expertise in radar technology by the Radiophysics Laboratory was world-class at the time, largely because Britain had shared the secret of radar with its Dominions as World War 2 began and due to a relatively large Australian radio physics community that had intimate ties with the ionospheric physicists in England.

Bolton was first assigned to measure the polarisation properties of sunspot radiations, an area of active investigation as the Sun was recently confirmed to be radio bright during World War 2. Bolton built two Yagi antennas and installed them at Dover Heights, Sydney. However, the Sun had entered a dormant period, with no sunspots on its surface. Having learnt of the discovery of radio emission from the plane of the Milky Way during his time at Cambridge University, and from observations onboard HMS Unicorn, Bolton speculated that there might be other radio bright stars like the Sun.

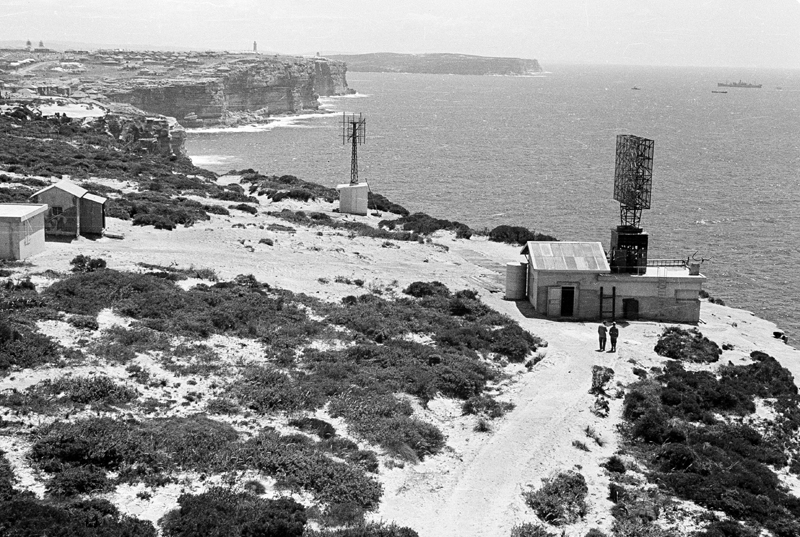
Sea Cliff Interferometer at Dover Heights, New South Wales

Following his intuition, Bolton and his colleague Owen Bruce Slee pointed the two Yagi antennas towards the horizon and used the instruments as a sea-cliff interferometer to gain greater resolution than possible by using the antennas by themselves. Such a decision led to direct conflict with Bolton's boss Joe Pawsey, who reassigned Bolton to help design Yagi antennas for a potential Solar eclipse expedition after finding the antennas not pointing at the Sun. However, the expedition collapsed and Bolton was again ordered to observe the Sun with the new equipment during the day, but was permitted to use the equipment at night to investigate other potential radio sources.

Through discussions with Pawsey, Bolton learnt there had been conflicting reports about a radio source in the constellation of Cygnus reported by Stanley Hey. With Gordon Stanley, the pair completed a shallow survey of the southern sky with the sea-cliff interferometer. They confirmed the existence of the bright Cygnus source, later named Cygnus A, but at a position substantially different than that reported by Hey, and two weaker sources near the constellation Centaurus and at the edge of Cygnus. It was also during these nighttime observing runs that Bolton largely self-taught himself astrophysics using recent publications in The Astrophysical Journal.

With the sea-cliff interferometer, Bolton and Stanley achieved a resolution greater than 15 times than that of Hey's observations. They could be confident that the radio emission in Cygnus came from an area less than 8'. While Hey is credited with the discovery of the first radio 'star', Bolton's result confirmed Hey's conclusion that the source had to be compact. In tandem, these results represented the beginning of the science associated with discrete radio sources. Further observations produced a refined position for Cygnus A but no convincing optical counterpart, such as a bright star, was found.

== Radio stars ==
Following the Cygnus result, Bolton, Stanley, and Slee set about systematically surveying the sky with an improved sea-cliff interferometer for other discrete radio sources. By February 1948, Bolton had evidence of six new discrete radio sources, and introduced the nomenclature of referring to the radio sources in a constellation alphabetically descending in brightness. This nomenclature is still in use in radio astronomy today for some of the brightest radio sources. Bolton showed that Cygnus A was not unique - either in its existence or in its lack of association with bright optical stellar counterparts. He had identified such famous radio sources as Taurus A, Centaurus A, and Hercules A.

Despite the expectation that acclaim would soon follow the revelations of a new class of objects previously unknown to astronomers, the astronomy community generally responded with skepticism due to the poor positional uncertainties and because the implications did not easily fit within the orthodox astronomical knowledge of the time. Furthermore, the amount of resources Bolton was occupying at the Radiophysics Lab for his discrete source investigation was leading to direct conflict with the Solar investigation team, in particular with Ruby Payne-Scott.

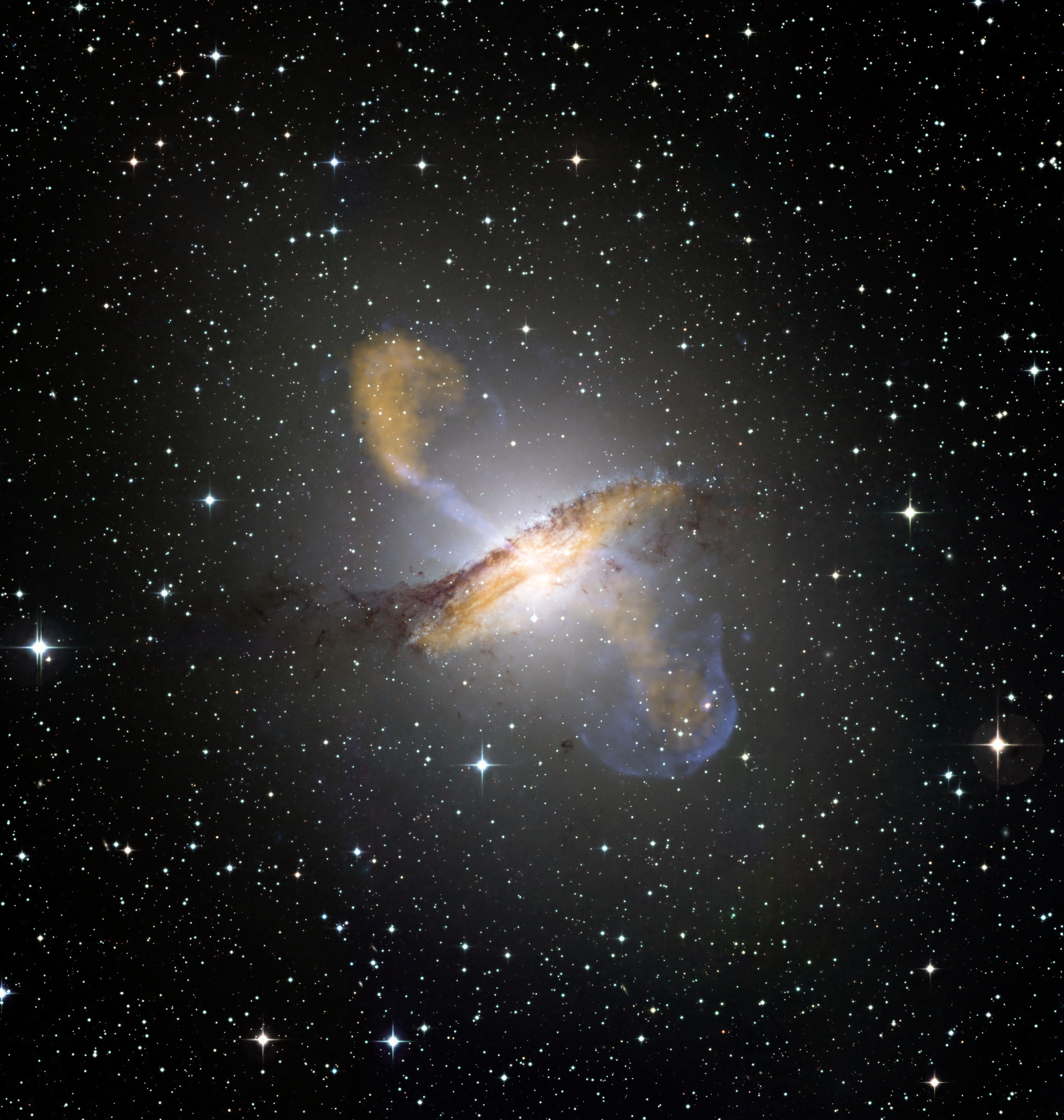
Optical image of Centaurus A with radio lobes overlaid.

In the effort to improve the impact of his results on discrete radio sources, Bolton chose to refine his source positions and eliminate any systematic uncertainties. Bolton and Stanley did this via an expedition to New Zealand, conducting sea-cliff interferometric observations from both New Zealand and Australia. These observations corrected the positions of the sources in the 1948 paper by over 1 degree. With 10 arcminute precision and a better handle on systematic uncertainties due to ionospheric refraction, Bolton could now reasonably suggest optical counterparts. While the optical candidate of Cygnus A remained elusive, Bolton showed that Taurus A was associated with the peculiar Crab Nebula, Virgo A with a galaxy that emanated a long jet-like structure (M87), and Centaurus A with such a peculiar object that astronomers were contemporarily arguing about whether it belonged to the Milky Way or not.

While Bolton was wrong in suggesting Centaurus A and Virgo A were peculiar Galactic sources, Bolton changed his opinion within months of the paper's publication as new optical data was analysed. The results of the 1949 paper gained the interest of traditional optical astronomers and is often considered the beginning of extragalactic radio astronomy. The 1949 paper was likely the most important and impactful paper produced in Bolton's career.

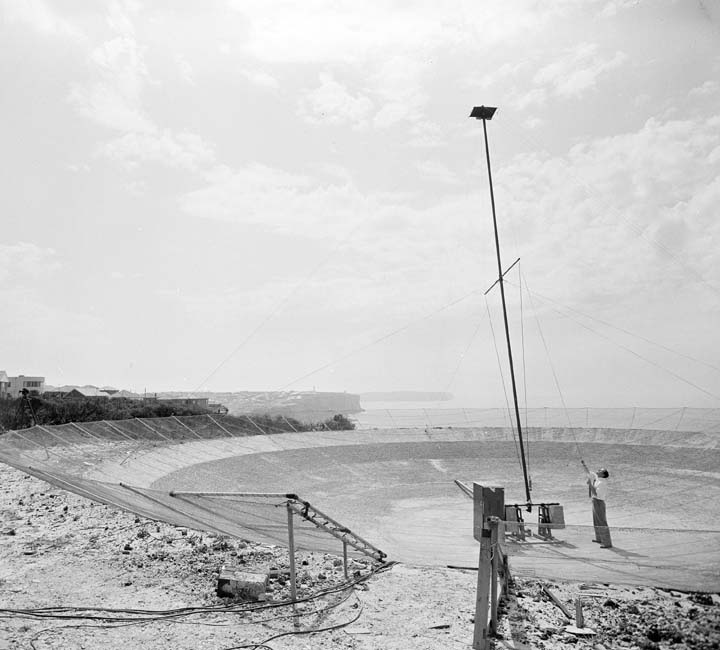
Parabolic Radio Dish at Dover Heights, New South Wales

On the basis of his recent academic success, Bolton did a tour of the key astronomy and radio engineering labs of the Northern Hemisphere in 1950. He was met with a frosty reception at the Cavendish by Martin Ryle and Lawrence Bragg, who were having too many guests visiting the lab at the time. However, during his Cambridge visit Bolton got to know the astrophysicist Fred Hoyle, which started a lifelong friendship and collaboration.

After returning from his trip, Bolton decided sea-cliff interferometry had reached its limit in terms of discovery, and decided to emulate the 220-ft parabolic aerial used by the Jodrell Bank group. At Dover Heights, New South Wales, they built a 72-ft parabolic dish into the soil. Using this instrument in 1953, Bolton and new CSIRO recruit Dick McGee surveyed the Galactic Plane, identifying the centre of the Milky Way - Sagittarius A.

Despite Bolton's academic success, Radio Astrophysics could only afford to build one large telescope in the 1950s. While Bolton insisted on building a larger dish modeled on his Dover Heights prototype, the laboratory favoured the Mills Cross radio interferometer. This decision led Bolton to direct conflict with his immediate boss Pawsey, after which he was reassigned by Bowen to the Cloud Physics division of Radio Astrophysics. This allowed Bowen to alleviate the conflict and provided the expertise of Bolton to his Cloud Physics group.

During Bolton's detour away from radio astronomy, he worked on understanding how to seed rainfall using silver iodide smoke jettisoned from aircraft. However, Bolton was aware during his brief stint in Cloud physics of the potential opportunity to start the radio astronomy group being established in California. Bolton accepted the position to set up a large radio telescope near Caltech offered by Lee Alvin DuBridge in 1954.

== Caltech and Owens Valley ==
On joining Caltech as head of the radio astronomy program, Bolton set about establishing an American radio observatory using funds from the Office of Naval Research and Caltech. Along with Gordon Stanley, Bolton identified Owens Valley as an ideal site for a radio observatory because its natural mountain ranges shielded interference from coastal Californian cities and since it was reasonably close to Caltech. Bolton's priority for the type of instrument to build at Owens Valley was one that could accurately localise the position of sources to find their optical counterparts and resolve their radio structure, building on the many poor resolution detections coming from such instruments as the Mills Cross.

Bolton led the building of a two-element interferometer, composed of two 90-foot antennas. This instrument would go on to be incredibly scientifically productive, the test-bed for many leading American radio astronomers, and a prototype for the Very Large Array. One of the first scientific contributions from the Owens Valley telescopes was confirmation of radio emission from Jupiter, which gained significant media and institutional recognition for the instrument. With the successful building of the Owens Valley interferometer, Bolton was promoted to full-professor. He was also awarded a PhD from Caltech, but he refused to use the title throughout his life and referred to it as a "de facto" PhD.

The superior resolution of the Owens Valley interferometer meant Bolton and his team were beginning to identify radio sources that still remained unresolved at 10 arcsecond resolution. Following up one of these sources in the optical, 3C295, identified the counterpart as a galaxy at a redshift of 0.46, more than doubling the distance to an object in the Universe. This line of science reasoning set the course for Bolton's career as he returned to Australia.

Despite his successes at Caltech, Bolton had an understanding with Bowen that he would return to Australia when a giant radio telescope was being built. Along with poor health caused by the low air quality in Pasadena smog, Bolton and his family decided to return to Australia in 1960.

== Parkes and quasars ==
Bolton arrived in Parkes, Australia as the development of the new Giant Radio Telescope was underway. Bowen had procured money from the Carnegie Institution for Science, Rockefeller Foundation, and the Australian government to develop a 64 m dish. Bolton had already played an important role in helping assess the design of the telescope, and now took ownership of construction and commission of the Parkes dish. He was also to be the inaugural director of the telescope.

The Parkes radio telescope, under guidance of Bolton, was completed on schedule and quickly contributed to two key radio astronomy results. Firstly, the telescope confirmed polarised radio emission from Centaurus A and Vela X. Detection of linear polarisation was confirmation that the radio emission from such sources is produced by the synchrotron mechanism. Secondly, and more importantly, Parkes detected Faraday rotation in polarised radio sources. This was the first astrophysical detection of the phenomenon and a result which was used as conclusive evidence that the Milky Way possessed a magnetic field.

While Bolton played a key role in the scientific direction of Parkes in these first two discoveries, his greatest scientific contribution with Parkes came with the discovery of quasars. Building on his work identifying optical sources to radio galaxies at Caltech, such as 3C48, accumulating evidence suggested there existed a unique class of active galaxies that were 100 times brighter optically than the most luminous galaxies which had been identified previously with radio sources. While not published, Bolton was first to correctly identify the extreme distance to 3C48 two years before it was published in 1962. The record to the most distant object in the Universe was regularly held by quasars discovered at Parkes by Bolton and his team.

After the discovery of the first quasars at Parkes, Bolton settled into the project that would occupy most of his time for the rest of the 1960s: surveying the southern sky with Parkes as to find new radio sources to associate to optical sources and determining their distances. He managed to follow this science path due to strong ties with optical astronomers at Palomar and Lick Observatories. At this career stage, Bolton was also being commissioned to chair government panels and present keynote lectures - with the pinnacle presenting the talk at the Solvay conference in 1964. In the 1960s, Bolton was also elected a Fellow of the Australian Academy of Science and was the inaugural NRAO Karl Jansky prize holder.

== Parkes and the Apollo 11 Moon Landing ==
As director of Parkes, Bolton also played a part in the Apollo 11 Moon landing. NASA suggested to CSIRO for Parkes to join the Deep Space Network and be in directly involved with the Jet Propulsion Laboratory (JPL). Bolton was keen to join this effort as he thought Parkes had a debt to NASA and the US for their help in construction and the numerous personal relationships he had developed there.

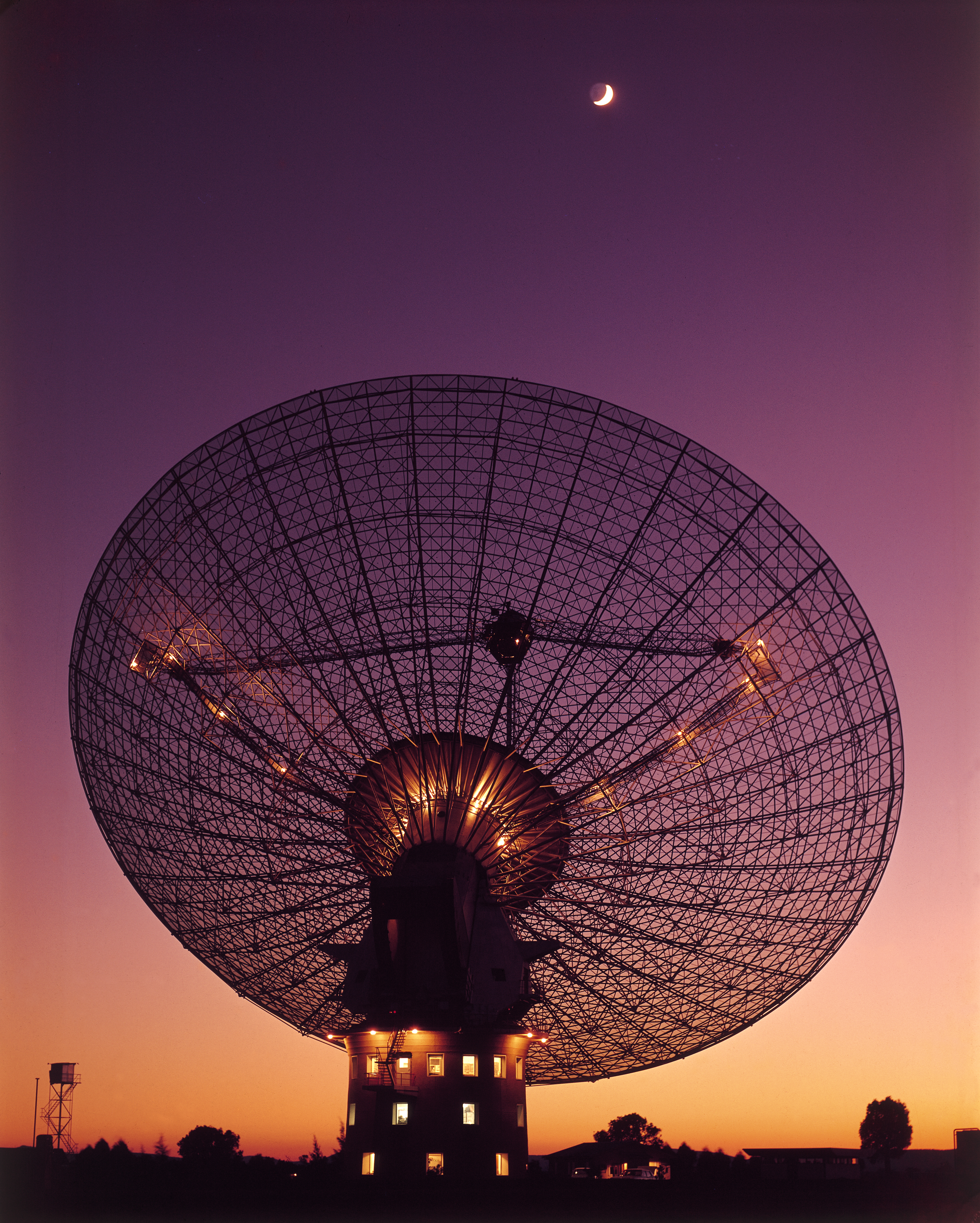
CSIRO's Parkes radio telescope in 1969, around the time of the Apollo 11 Moon landing.

NASA's initial request was for Parkes to provide back-up in case the Apollo 11 moonwalk was delayed or in case of any failures in NASA's own tracking stations. Bolton and the Parkes technical crew took responsibility for ensuring the telescope's drive and control systems were in working order. Due to changes in the moonwalk schedule, NASA received TV signals from three sources - Goldstone, Honeysuckle Creek, and Parkes. NASA switched between Goldstone and Honeysuckle for the first few minutes of the moonwalk but the signal from Parkes was used for the remainder of the moonwalk. The role Parkes and Bolton played in the Apollo 11 Moon landing was dramatised in the 2000 film The Dish. Bolton would ensure Parkes would be involved in tracking for all the Apollo missions.

== Later years at Parkes and awards ==
Bolton stepped down as Parkes director in 1971 to ease his administrative workload. While stepping down as director, Bolton continued pursuing science. For the remainder of his scientific career, he would focus on optical identifications of radio sources that were being surveyed by Parkes at 2.7 GHz. One significant result from this survey, when combined with previous low-frequency surveys, was Bolton's discovery of the peaked-spectrum source PKS B1934-638.

Bolton was elected to the Royal Society of London and vice-president of the International Astronomical Union in 1973. Furthermore, he was awarded the Royal Astronomical Society Gold Medal in 1977 for his contributions to optical and radio astronomy. After a series of heart attacks, Bolton died in 1993.

=== Honours and awards ===
Bolton received the following awards:

- 1951 Edgeworth David Medal (Australia)
- 1967 First Karl Jansky Lecturer (U.S.)
- 1968 Henry Norris Lecturer (U.S.)
- 1969 Elected Fellow of the Australian Academy of Science
- 1972 Elected Foreign Honorary Member of the American Academy of Arts and Sciences
- 1973 Vice-President of the International Astronomical Union (1973–79)
- Elected Fellow of the Royal Society of London
- Elected Honorary Fellow of the Indian Academy of Sciences
- 1977 Gold Medal of the Royal Astronomical Society
- 1980 Elected Foreign Associate of the U.S. National Academy of Sciences
- 1982 Birthday Honours Commander of the Order of the British Empire
- 1988 Bruce Medal of the Astronomical Society of the Pacific (U.S.)

== In popular culture ==
- The Australian movie The Dish was about the role of the Parkes Radio Telescope in the Moon landing in 1969. The role of the director of the observatory (Cliff Buxton, played by Sam Neill) is based on John Bolton.
- Bolton had the asteroid 12140 Johnbolton named in his honour.
