= Owen Bruce Slee =

Australian radio astronomer (1924–2016)

Owen Bruce Slee AM
- Slee in 1989 at Dover Heights
- Born: 10 August 1924; Adelaide, South Australia, Australia
- Died: 18 August 2016 (aged 92); Australia
- Education: Sydney Technical College; University of New South Wales
- Known for: Discovery of solar radio emission Discovery of the first discrete radio sources
- Spouse: Maxine Linnett (m. 1948)
- Awards: Minor planet 9391 Slee named in his honour
- Scientific career
- Fields: Radio astronomy
- Workplaces: CSIRO Division of Radiophysics; Royal Radar Establishment, Malvern; Australia Telescope National Facility

Owen Bruce Slee AM (10 August 1924 – 18 August 2016) was an Australian radio astronomer regarded as one of the pioneers of the field in Australia. During the Second World War he independently detected solar radio emission, and after joining the CSIRO's Division of Radiophysics in 1946 he contributed to the discovery of the first discrete radio sources, a development that helped establish extragalactic radio astronomy as a field. Over a career spanning around 70 years, he studied phenomena ranging from the solar corona to distant galaxy clusters.

== Early life and education ==
Slee was born on 10 August 1924 in Adelaide, South Australia, the second of three children of a carpenter. During the Great Depression, the family lost their home and moved to live with relatives at Kadina on the Yorke Peninsula, where his father found work at a gold mine. The family later moved to Woodside in the Adelaide Hills in 1936. Slee completed primary schooling at Woodside and secondary schooling at nearby Birdwood.

After leaving school, Slee took a clerical position with the South Australian Lands Department before joining the Royal Australian Air Force at the age of 18, where he trained as a radio and radar mechanic. It was during his wartime service that he independently detected solar radio emission, work that later placed him among the earliest observers of the phenomenon.

== Career ==
Slee joined the CSIRO's Division of Radiophysics in 1946. Working at the Dover Heights field station in Sydney alongside colleagues including John Bolton, Dick McGee, Gordon Stanley, Kevin Westfold, and Joseph Pawsey, Slee contributed to early radio astronomy observations that led to the discovery of the first discrete, point-like radio sources. This discovery is considered foundational to the development of extragalactic radio astronomy.

In the 1950s, working under Bernard Mills alongside colleagues Alec Little and Kevin Sheridan using the Mills Cross instrument, Slee helped conduct a survey of the sky that detected more than 2,000 radio sources. The team's observations contributed to evidence supporting the expanding universe model over the rival steady-state model championed by British astronomer Fred Hoyle, bringing them into scientific conflict with Hoyle.

Slee worked as a research officer with the CSIRO from 1946 to 1962 before leaving overseas. He returned to the CSIRO in 1966 as a principal research officer. Over his career he made use of a succession of radio telescopes, from simple Yagi antennas at Dover Heights to the Australia Telescope Compact Array and the Very Large Array in the United States, and collaborated with researchers from 18 countries.

Slee's research over a roughly 70-year career covered an unusually broad range of topics, including the solar corona, Jovian radio bursts, comet tails, active stars, pulsars, the interstellar medium, galaxies, galaxy clusters and quasars. In the 1990s he also began research into the history of radio astronomy.

Slee retired from the Australia Telescope National Facility in 1989, but continued research as a Research Associate with the ATNF and later CSIRO Astronomy and Space Science (CASS) until his death, with further co-authored papers published after he died.

== Honours ==
Slee was a member of the International Astronomical Union. The IAU named minor planet 9391 Slee in his honour just before he died.

Slee was posthumously appointed a Member of the Order of Australia (AM) for "significant service to science, particularly in the field of radio astronomy, as a researcher, author and mentor of young scientists".

== Death ==
Slee died on 18 August 2016, aged 92, a week after his birthday and a day after a workshop was held at the University of Sydney to celebrate his life and work.
