= Gordon Stanley =

Gordon Stanley may refer to:

- Gordon Stanley (actor) (born 1951), American stage actor
- Gordon J. Stanley (1921–2001), New Zealand-born radio astronomer
- Gordon Arthur Stanley (1921–1956), United States Navy aviator
