= Joseph L. Pawsey =

Australian scientist, radiophysicist and radio astronomer

Joseph Pawsey
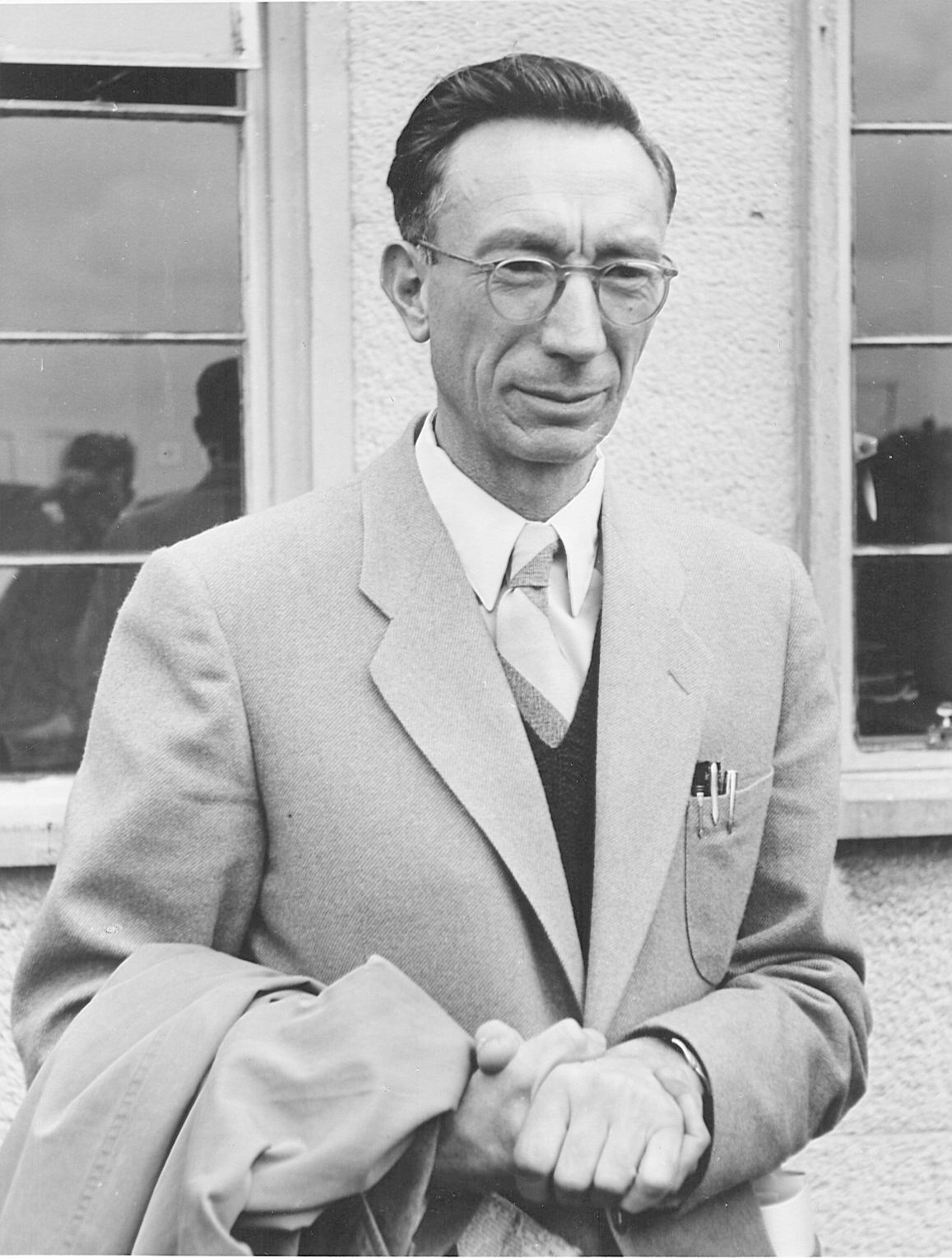
- Pawsey in 1955
- Born: Joseph Lade Pawsey; 14 May 1908; Ararat, Victoria, Australia
- Died: 30 November 1962 (aged 54); Sydney, Australia
- Education: University of Melbourne; Sidney Sussex College, Cambridge
- Known for: Early leadership of radio astronomy and ionospheric physics, Radio observations of the Sun and Galaxy
- Awards: Fellow of the Royal Society; Hughes Medal (1960)
- Scientific career
- Fields: Radio astronomy
- Workplaces: CSIRO

Joseph Lade Pawsey (14 May 1908 – 30 November 1962) was an Australian scientist, radiophysicist and radio astronomer.

== Education ==
Pawsey was born in Ararat, Victoria to a family of farmers. At the age of 14 he was awarded a government scholarship to study at Wesley College, Melbourne, followed by a scholarship to study at the University of Melbourne. In 1929, he earned his Bachelor of Science degree from the university, followed by a Master of Science in Natural Philosophy in 1931.

Pawsey was then awarded an Exhibition Research Scholarship to study at Sidney Sussex College at the University of Cambridge, where he worked under the direction of J.A. Ratcliffe. He studied the effects of the ionosphere on radio propagation and his discovery of the presence of irregularities in the Kennelly-Heaviside Layer proved vital to the later development of this branch of ionospheric physics. In 1935, he was awarded a PhD from Cambridge and in September of that year he married Greta Lenore Nicoll, a 32-year-old Canadian.

Pawsey then became a research physicist at EMI until 1939.

== Career ==
In February 1940, Pawsey returned to Australia to work at the recently formed Division of Radiophysics in CSIR (later renamed CSIRO). One group he led developed a microwave set for the Royal Australian Navy while another group under his direction investigated the 'super-refraction' of radio waves in the Earth's atmosphere. Pawsey continued as a research physicist at the Division of Radiophysics until 1962, becoming assistant chief of division in 1952.

At the end of World War II he became a pioneer of the new science of radio astronomy, his interest being stirred by the discovery of radio waves from the Galaxy and by reports of intense interference in metre-wave radar receivers caused by disturbances on the Sun. To investigate the latter Pawsey, with Ruby Payne-Scott and Lindsay McCready, used an existing Royal Australian Air Force antenna at Collaroy Plateau, a northern Sydney suburb. In addition to confirming that the Sun was a source of radio noise their data also showed that the temperature in some regions of the Sun were as high as one million degrees. This temperature was far higher than was thought possible at the time. Work by the physicist David Forbes Martyn showed that temperatures peak in the Sun's corona at one million degrees. The observations with the Collaroy antenna not only marked the beginning of radio astronomy in Australia, but also the first time radio astronomy had provided important information on a problem in traditional optical astronomy.

The introduction of interferometry was probably Pawsey's most important contribution to radio astronomy. In early 1946 he turned his attention to sunspots as a source of strong fluctuating radio noise. To overcome the limitations of the available antennas, Pawsey used sea interferometry and began observations at Dover Heights which provided a better vantage point than Collaroy. The observations confirmed beyond doubt that sunspots were the source of the strong increase in radio noise. This work was confirmed four months later by radio astronomers at Cambridge University led by Martin Ryle.

Members of Pawsey's group invented techniques that were subsequently incorporated into general use in radio astronomy and made important discoveries about the discrete sources of radio emission in the Milky Way and external galaxies. Pawsey did some work on his own, but his main focus was on guiding and administering his research teams, which worked in comparative isolation and sometimes in competition with each other. He was straightforward, honest and humble, and scrupulous in acknowledging his colleagues' achievements. His subordinate Paul Wild, who in 1971 became division chief, said:

Joe Pawsey was the ... father of radio astronomy in Australia. ... His influence on the growth of radio astronomy in Australia was great because … he just provided ideal conditions, an ideal environment to allow everyone to use their own initiative. ... [He] was a wonderfully inspiring leader, very self-effacing and taking no credit for himself, and he was a delight to work under. ... [His advice] was often very perceptive, very good".

International authorities gave much credit to his leadership. In 1963, in his introduction to the Utrecht Symposium on the Solar Spectrum, Professor M.G.J. Minnaert remarked:

The history of solar radio-spectroscopy is mainly the history of Australian work on this subject. At each meeting of the IAU, at each important symposium on radio-astronomy, highly competent specialists such as Wild, Smerd and Christianson, headed by the dynamic personality of ... Pawsey, were able to announce spectacular progress.

In 1952, Pawsey became president of the Radio Astronomy Commission of the International Astronomical Union, serving until 1958. From 1960 until 1961 he was president of the Australian Branch of the Institute of Physics. He was appointed as director of the US National Radio Astronomy Observatory in 1962, but he died in Sydney of a brain tumour before he took office. He was survived by his wife, two sons and a daughter.

The crater Pawsey on the Moon is named after him. Also named after him is the Pawsey Supercomputing Centre, the home of petascale supercomputing facilities and expertise to support international Square Kilometre Array research and other high-end science (based at Technology Park in the Perth suburb of Kensington).

== Awards and honours ==
- Thomas Ranken Lyle Medal, 1953.
- Fellow, Royal Society, 1954.
- Matthew Flinders Medal and Lecture, 1957
- Royal Society Hughes Medal, 1960.
- Foundation Fellow of the Australian Academy of Science, 1954.Fellow, Australian Academy of Science (1954).
- Honorary DSc from the Australian National University, 1961.
- The Pawsey Medal of the Australian Academy of Science, awarded since 1967, commemorates his contributions to science in Australia.
- The Pawsey Memorial Lecture is delivered annually by a distinguished scientist.

== Bibliography ==
- R.N. Bracewell and J.L. Pawsey, Radio Astronomy, 1955, Clarendon Press.
- J L Pawsey et al., "Cosmic radio waves and their interpretation", 1961, Rep. Prog. Phys. 24.

== See also ==
- Joan Maie Freeman
- Ruby Payne-Scott
