= Alex Popov (architect) =

Australian architect

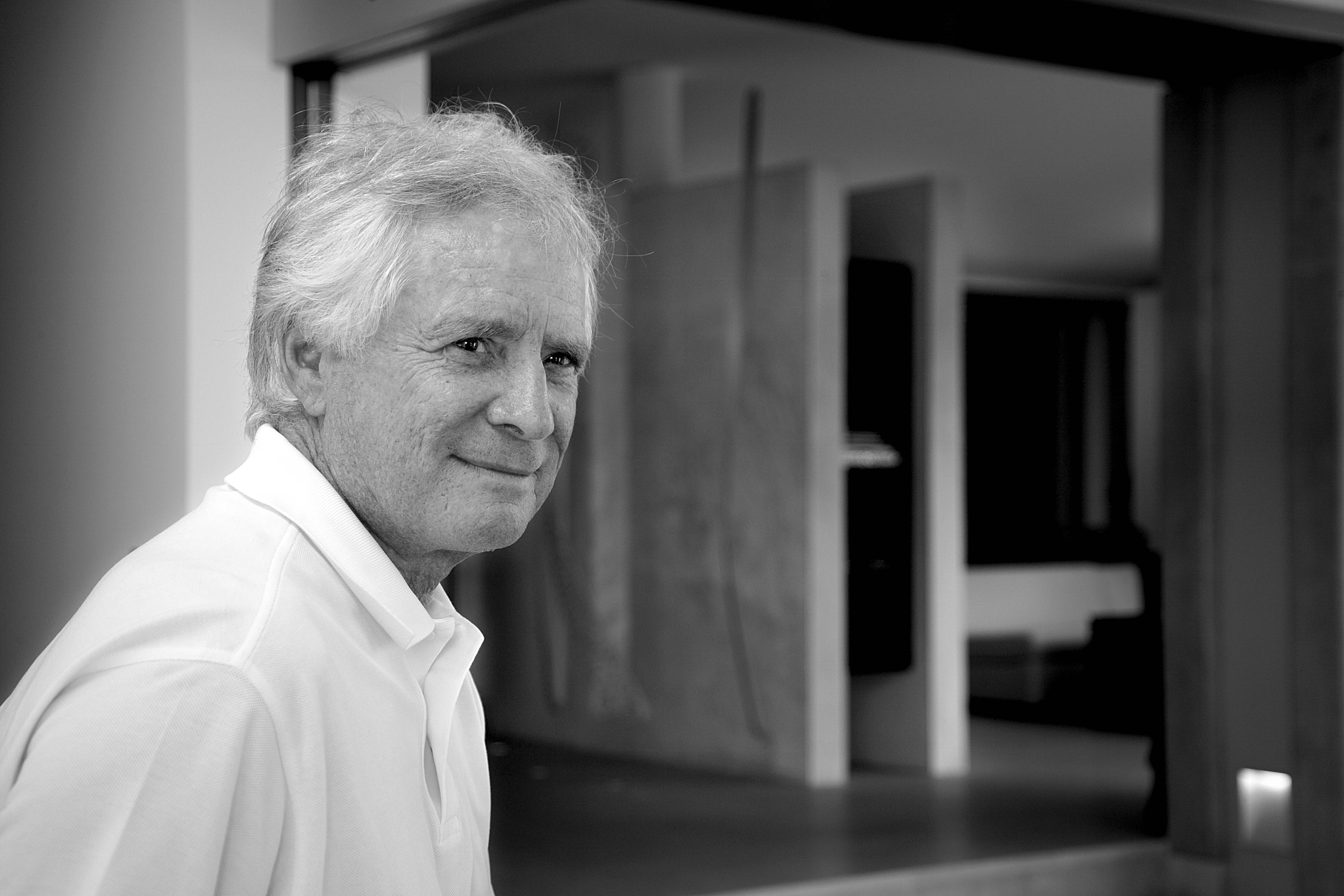
- Born: 3 February 1942 (age 84); Shanghai, China
- Occupation: Architect
- Awards: Wilkinson Award, 1990, 2014; Robin Boyd Award, 1990
- Practice: Popov Bass
- Projects: See below
- Website: PopovBass

Alexander Popov (born 3 February 1942) is an Australian architect working in the Late 20th Century Modern style.

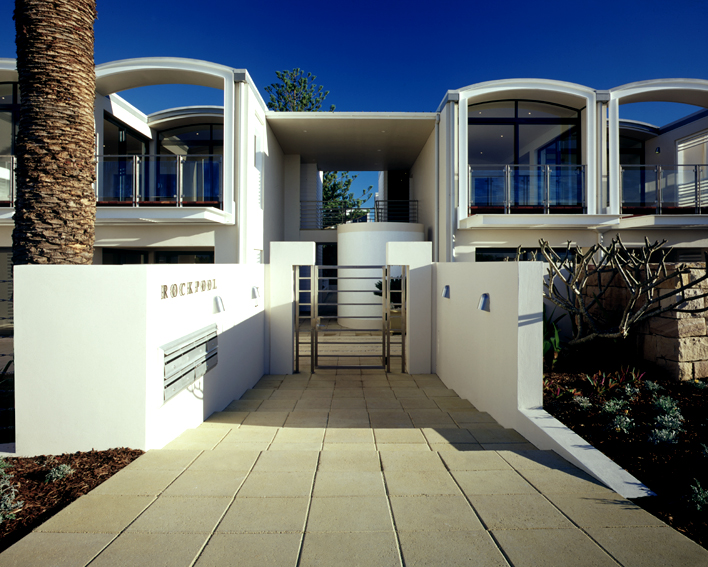
Rockpool in Sydney

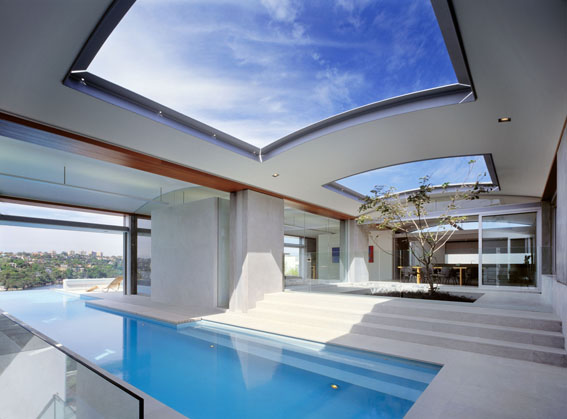
Northbridge House in Sydney

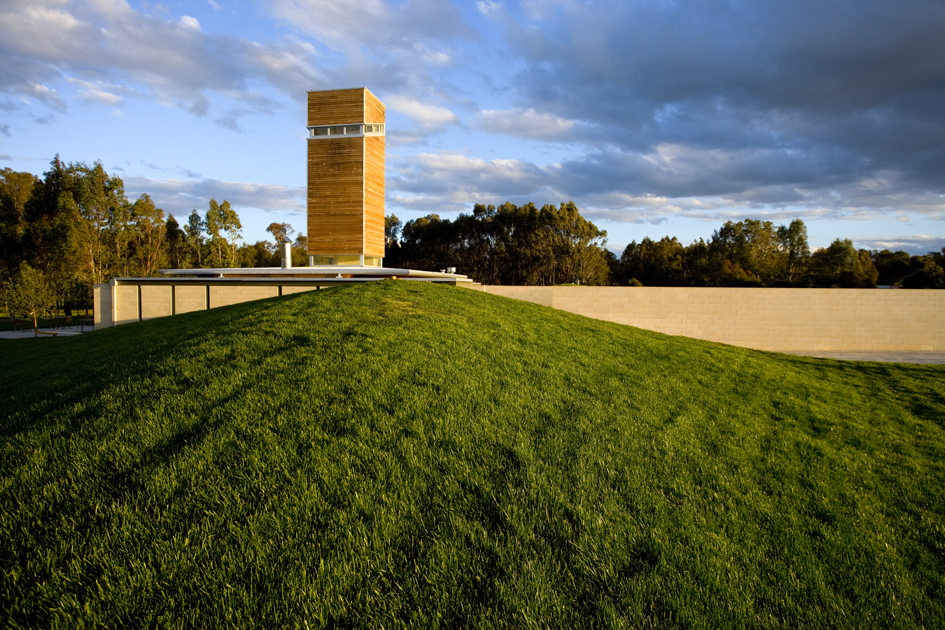
Sam Miranda Winery in Victoria

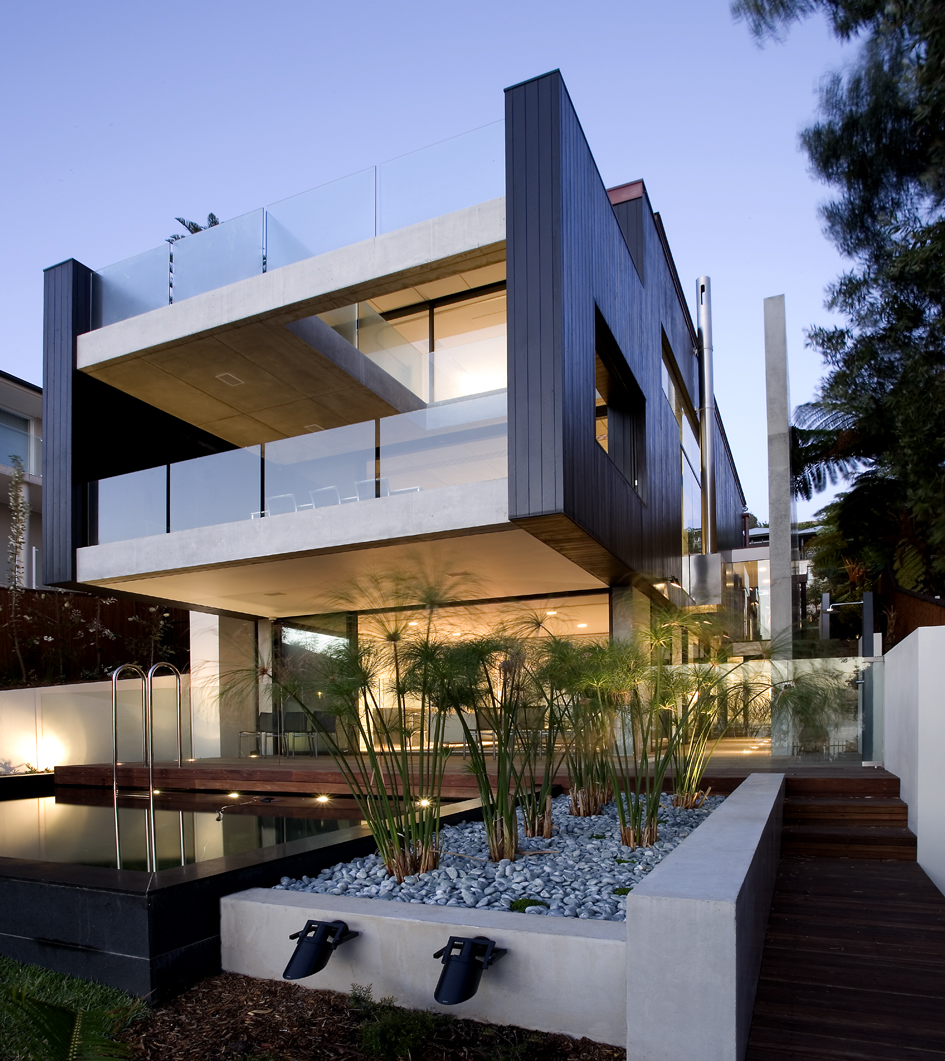
Whale Beach House in Sydney

== Biography ==
Popov was born in Shanghai, China to Russian parents and moved to Sydney aged twelve. He was educated at Newington College (1958–1960) and the University of New South Wales before studying further in Denmark. Popov graduated in architecture from the Royal Danish Academy of Art in 1971 and then worked with Henning Larsen and Jørn Utzon (to whose daughter Lin he was married for 15 years). He returned to Australia in 1983 and established Alex Popov Architects (later Alex Popov & Associates). The practice is now known as PopovBass with both Australian architect Brian Bass and Alex Popov as directors. The practice has been successful in a number of design competitions and has received numerous major awards from the Royal Australian Institute of Architects including several Wilkinson Awards and the Robin Boyd Award.

An original monograph on Popov's earlier works, titled Alex Popov: Buildings and Projects with text by Paul McGillick and photography by Kraig Carlstrom, was published by Axel Menges, Stuttgart. Another comprehensive monograph titled Alex Popov Architects : Selected Works 1999—2007 with text by Anna Johnson and photography by Patrick Bingham-Hall was published by Pesaro Publishing.

== Key works ==
- Griffiths Teas Apartments, Surry Hills
- Griffith House, Griffith
- Balmoral House, Balmoral
- Mosman House, Mosman
- Point Piper House, Point Piper
- The Grantham, Potts Point
- Middle Cove House, Middle Cove
- Whale Beach House, Whale Beach
- Sam Miranda Winery, Oxley
- Canopy, Cammeray
- Northbridge House, Northbridge
- Castlecrag House, Castlecrag
- Thredbo, Thredbo
- Rockpool, Mona Vale
- Griffin House, Castlecrag
- SCECGS Redlands Gymnasium. Cremorne

== Awards ==
- 2014 Wilkinson Award for Residential Architecture (New) — Griffith House, Griffith
- 2011 Mosman Design Awards — Mosman House 2, Mosman
- 2005 RAIA Robin Boyd Award Commendation — Canopy, Cammeray
- 2005 RAIA Award for Architecture Multiple Housing — Canopy, Cammeray
- 2005 RAIA Commendation Single Housing — Northbridge House
- 2000 RAIA Award for Architecture Single and Multiple Housing — Rockpool, Mona Vale
- 1996 RAIA Robin Boyd Award Commendation — Florida Road, Palm Beach
- 1992 RAIA Sulman Merit Award — SCEGS Redlands Gymnasium, Cremorne
- 1992 RAIA Architecture Australia Prize for Unbuilt Projects — Sydney Opera House Boardwalk
- 1990 RAIA Robin Boyd Award for Outstanding Architectural Project — Griffin House, Castlecrag
- 1990 RAIA Wilkinson Award Residential Architecture Griffin House, Castlecrag

== Bibliography ==
- The New Asia Pacific House Patrick Bingham-Hall 2010
- POPOV Alex Popov Architects Selected Works 1999-2007 Anna Johnson (photography by Patrick Bingham-Hall) 2008
- Concrete Poetry Joe Rollo 2004
- Alex Popov: Buildings and Projects Paul McGillick (photographs Kraig Carlstrom) 2002
- Australian Architecture Now Davina Jackson 2002
- Living in Sydney 2001
- Guide to Sydney Architecture Graham Jahn 1997
- Award Winning Australian Architecture Neville Quarry 1996
- Australian Style Bettsy Walters 1992
