= Holman House, Dover Heights =

Holman House

General information
- Location: 20 Hunter Street, Dover Heights, New South Wales, Australia
- Coordinates: 33.869723°S 151.283495°E
- Completed: 2004; 22 years ago

Technical details
- Floor area: 325 m^{2} (3,500 sq ft)

Design and construction
- Architect: David Jaggers
- Architecture firm: Durbach Block Architects
- Structural engineer: Baigents (Prof. Robert Herbertson)
- Services engineer: AEC
- Other designers: Jane Irwin Landscape Architects
- Quantity surveyor: Page Kirkland
- Main contractor: LH Building Services (Jon Adamson, Rob Laycock)
- Awards: Wilkinson Award, 2005 & Commendation for Residential Architecture, 2005 (National)

Website
- durbachblockjaggers.com/projects/residential/house-holman

Holman House, in Dover Heights, New South Wales, Australia was completed in 2004 to a design by architectural firm Durbach Block Architects. The firm is located in Potts Point, Sydney, Australia, and is a small architectural practice who specialise in residential and public space designs. The house was the winner of the Wilkinson Award in 2005.

== Site ==
Dover Heights, one of Sydney’s most affluent suburbs, is mainly residential. One side of the street is an ordinary walk but on the east side these regular houses become extraordinary due to their panoramic views over the Pacific Ocean.

Holman House is sited on the edge of a 70-metre-high (230 ft) cliff on the edge of Dover Heights, providing a view across the ocean. The house cantilevers 6 m from this edge and at its furthest corner one is over the sea.

Durbach explains: “We thought we will probably never have a site like this again. It was an opportunity to do something significant”.

== Concept ==
Durbach and Block liked the idea of being able to look up and down the coast from many vantage points in the house, but to get to that point, designing the house became an adventure that completely took over their lives “but in a good way”.

Tension within the design process arose when it took almost six months before they established a form for the house. Eventually, Durbach stumbled across Pablo Picasso's The Bather (1928), which became an inspiration for his design. The shapes of the kitchen and living room, which are cantilevered over the sea by four angled stilts, are derived this from the figure in this painting.

== Architectural spaces ==
The mastery of space is seen in Holman House when spending time within the 325-square-metre (3,500 sq ft) house. The extensive views of the sky and sea can be experienced. The view could get monotonous so the spaces are divided so that each view became individual from its vantage point. “You don’t have to see the view at every moment”, explains Block, which in turn, from a spatial perspective, gives a cinematic way of seeing the view.

The kitchen is low and intimate and reveals itself slowly into the living area. There is no hallway because the horizon connects all the spaces and once in the living-dining room a massive curved masonry wall is bisected horizontally by a band of glass that frames the sea and cuts off most of the sky. Mirrors are placed at the corners to dissolve the edges as well as reflect unexpected expressions of the gardens and pool as one moves around. The more private spaces are revealed through a connecting secret passage which eventuates into the room with a striking blue backdrop.

== Structure and materiality ==
The main overhang is supported by four steel inclined pillars which support the top floor. The ground floor is constructed with natural stone walls which becomes an extension of the cliff itself. These walls also in turn support the structure of reinforced concrete from the upper deck.

The house appears monolithic as its white form sits upon the jagged coastline. The interior and exterior act as one single form; looking out of the house you are surrounded by a smooth white texture complemented by a sea of blue, looking onto the house from the exterior you are surrounded by a sea of blue complemented by a smooth white textured form.

Internally, walls lead to floor-to-ceiling windows with views of the sea.

Block says, “When the house is too smooth and perfect, it looks banal” and further refers to the term Wabi-sabi. The brick rendering in the living space for example contrasts with the smooth plastered wall opposite.
