= Rachel Makinson =

Australian physicist

Rachel Makinson AM FTSE
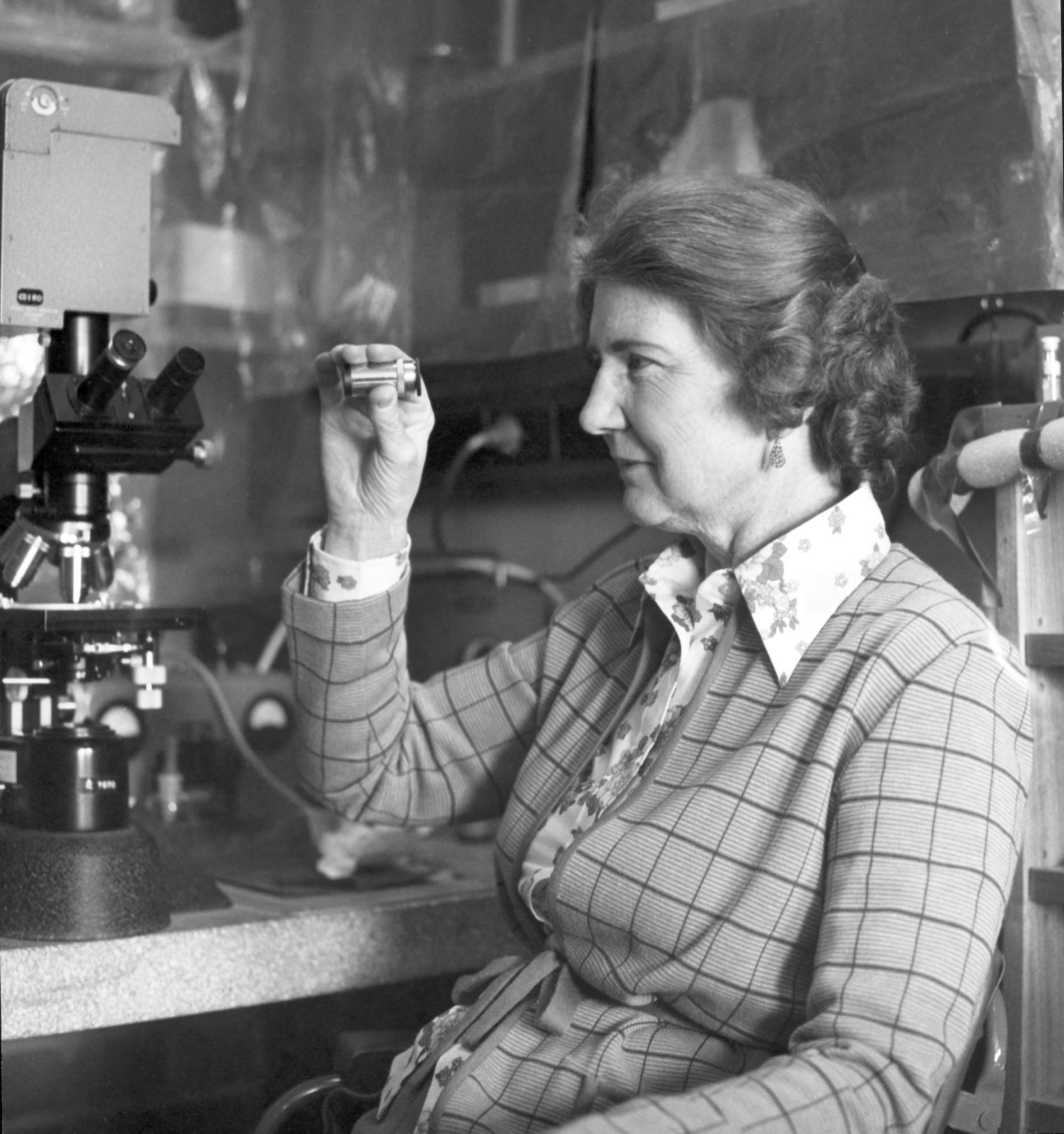
- Makinson at work at CSIRO
- Born: Kathleen Rachel White; 15 February 1917; England
- Died: 18 October 2014 (aged 97); Sydney, New South Wales, Australia
- Education: Newnham College, Cambridge, UK
- Spouse: Richard Elliss Bodenham Makinson (1913–1979)
- Scientific career
- Fields: Physics
- Workplaces: Commonwealth Scientific and Industrial Research Organisation

Kathleen Rachel Makinson AM FTSE (née White) (15 February 1917 – 18 October 2014) was an Australian physicist and the first woman to become a chief research scientist at the country's research organization, CSIRO.

== Biography ==
Kathleen Rachel White was born 15 February 1917 near London, England the eldest of three children. She was remembered by one teacher as "a voracious reader at school".

She became interested in science at age 12 or 13, "I got hooked on atoms and molecules". Growing up in England, during the Depression, her father lost his job as a head teacher and found employment, but with a reduction in pay. She learned as a teenager that teachers' salaries varied by gender, saying "the Council that ran the schools 'appointed female heads at half the salary'."

She earned a Bachelor of Arts (1939) and, later, a PhD in physics (1970), both from Newnham College, part of the University of Cambridge, in England.

She had been awarded a scholarship to study physics at Cambridge University, achieving a Double First in 1939, and was aiming for a career in X-ray crystallography, but after meeting an Australian physicist at the university, she agreed to postpone her doctorate, move to his home country and marry. She arrived with her husband, Richard Makinson (1913–1979), as World War II was raging in Europe.

In Australia, her husband was offered a position at the University of Sydney as a physics lecturer but no similar position was offered to Rachel as the country had placed rigid barriers to prevent most employment of married women.

=== Researcher ===
In the 1940s, Rachel Makinson, her preferred name, took the opportunities she had, including tutoring "several cohorts of RAAF airmen in the rudiments of radio physics as a precursor to radar training". She was enlisted to join a team of 60 physicists to develop radar technology at Australia's Commonwealth Scientific and Industrial Research Organisation (CSIRO), in the Radiophysics Laboratory and was one of only three women on the team, including Ruby Payne-Scott, and Joan Maie Freeman.

=== Expertise ===
After the end of World War II, research into the physics of wool fibres had become increasingly important to Australian wool producers, which inspired the CSIRO to launch a Division of Textile Physics. The organizers recruited as a scientific officer "a young Englishwoman," Makinson, who would become "an international authority on felting, friction and shrinkproofing" of woolen textiles. She is quoted as saying that, at the time, "next to nothing" was known about of the physical properties of wool fibres or about the processes of felting and shrinkage. The only shrinkproofing method available at that time was chlorination, however that process was known to damage the wool fibres and was not well understood from a scientific perspective.

Makinson began work in the Division of Textile Physics in 1953, and was a senior principal research scientist from 1971 to 1977. She devoted her research to carefully examining the "underlying physics of wool fibres and their microscopic interactions." Her appointment did not come without obstacles. As a married woman, she was denied the chance to hold a permanent position at the CSIRO so, for many years, she was retained as a temporary employee and had to seek official reappointment every year.

Beginning in the early 1960s, Makinson used her own organizational success to campaign for the fair treatment of her female colleagues. To do so, she helped form the CSIRO Officers Association and used that group to promote equal pay for women on the staff. By applying her research skills, she collected and presented data to management supporting her causes illustrating "the systemic nature of discrimination in pay and seniority".

She was the first woman to become a chief research scientist at CSIRO (1977–1982). From 1979 to 1982, she was the assistant chief of the division, also the first woman to hold such a position. According to her obituary, she succeed despite obstacles,

"In 1979, she became Assistant Chief of Division, the first woman to achieve that rank in CSIRO (having been told by her male boss some years before that 'I will not have a woman in a senior position if I can help it.')".

=== Final years ===
Throughout her life she loved bushwalking, identifying native plants and exploring Aboriginal Australia.

After the death of her husband in 1976 and her retirement from CSIRO, Makinson moved to the Blue Mountains, where she became active in conservation efforts with the Blue Mountains Conservation Society and Historical Society. When her health declined in the 1990s, she returned to Sydney and died 18 October 2014, survived by two sons.

== Honors ==
- 1981: Elected a Fellow of the Australian Academy of Technological Sciences and Engineering
- 1982: Made a Member of the Order of Australia (AM) "for public service in the field of wool research"
- 1987: Made a Fellow of the Australian Academy of Technological Sciences and Engineering (FTSE) (1987-2014)
- 2003: Awarded the Commonwealth Government's centenary medal "for service to Australian Society in textile physics"

== Selected publications ==
- Mercer, E. H., and K. Rachel Makinson. "20—the Frictional Properties of Wool and Other Textile Fibres." Journal of the Textile Institute Transactions 38.5 (1947): T227-T240.
- Makinson, K. Rachel. "On the cause of the frictional difference of the wool fibre." Transactions of the Faraday Society 44 (1948): 279–282.
- Makinson, K. Rachel. "Some Replica Techniques Useful in Electron Microscopy of the Surface of the Wool Fiber." Textile Research Journal 20.1 (1950): 22–28.
- Makinson, K. Rachel. "Studies of the Movement of Wool Fibers in Fabrics During Felting, With Particular Reference to the Permanency of Pleats: Part I: Light Felting and its Effect on Pleats in a Worsted Fabric." Textile Research Journal 29.5 (1959): 431–439.
- Makinson, K. Rachel, and David Tabor. "The friction and transfer of polytetrafluoroethylene." Proceedings of the Royal Society of London. Series A. Mathematical and Physical Sciences 281.1384 (1964): 49–61.
- Makinson, K. Rachel. "Some New Observations on the Effects of Mild Shrinkproofing Treatments on Wool Fibers." Textile Research Journal 38.8 (1968): 831–842.
- Makinson, K. Rachel. "Mechanisms involved in shrinkproofing by degradative treatments." (1971).
- Makinson, K. Rachel, and Judith A. Lead. "The nature and function of the resin in the chlorine/resin shrinkproofing treatment of wool tops." Textile Research Journal 43.11 (1973): 669–681.
- Makinson, K. Rachel. "The role of chlorine in oxidative antifelting treatments of wool." Textile Research Journal 44.11 (1974): 856–857.
