= Joan Maie Freeman =

Australian physicist (1918–1998)

Joan M. Freeman AO
- Born: 7 January 1918; Perth, Australia
- Died: 18 March 1998 (aged 80); Oxford, Australia
- Education: Newnham College, Cambridge
- Awards: Ernest Rutherford Medal and Prize
- Scientific career
- Fields: Physics
- Workplaces: Harwell Tandem Accelerator Group; Council for Scientific and Industrial Research

Joan Maie Freeman AO (7 January 1918 – 18 March 1998) was an Australian physicist.

== Biography ==
Joan Maie Freeman was born in Perth, Australia on 7 January 1918. Her family moved to Sydney in 1922 and she attended the Sydney Church of England Girls Grammar School. While still a girl, she took evening classes at Sydney Technical College. The school hid her attendance from inspectors, as they thought a girl in the class would reflect negatively on the college. She completed her Intermediate Certificate Examination and earned a place at the University of Sydney in 1936. Freeman studied mathematics, chemistry, physics and zoology, and was often the only woman, indeed the school stipulated that a seat had to be left vacant between women and men in a lecture hall). She received her BSc in 1940 and was awarded a Commonwealth Research Scholarship to continue her MSc (awarded 1943), along with other prizes.

== Career ==
Freeman took a position at the Radiophysics Laboratory of the Council for Scientific and Industrial Research as a research officer in June 1941. She researched radar during World War II. After the war ended, Freeman engaged in research on the behaviour of low-pressure gas discharges at microwave frequencies. The Council for Scientific and Industrial Research then awarded her a Senior Studentship that allowed her to read for her PhD at the University of Cambridge in England. She attended Newnham College and later studied short-range alpha particles with Alex Baxter, working on the HT1 accelerator.

In 1951 Freeman became Senior Scientific Officer at the Harwell Tandem Accelerator Group. She later led the group and received the Ernest Rutherford Medal and Prize in 1976 with Roger Blin-Stoyle, for their research of the beta-radioactivity of complex nuclei. She was the first woman to win the Ernest Rutherford Medal and Prize. She received an honorary doctorate from Sydney University and fellowships from the Institute of Physics and the American Physical Society. She retired reluctantly from the Atomic Energy Research Establishment in 1978, due to their policies on retirement age, but continued as a consultant.

Freeman was posthumously appointed Officer of the Order of Australia (AO) in the 1999 Australia Day Honours for "service to science in the field of nuclear physics and to the environment as an advocate for social responsibility in scientific research".

Freeman wrote the 1991 book A Passion for Physics. Freeman married John Jelley in 1958. She died in Oxford on 18 March 1998.

== See also ==
- Ruby Payne-Scott
- Rachel Makinson
- Joseph Lade Pawsey
