= Ruby Payne-Scott =

Australian radio astronomer

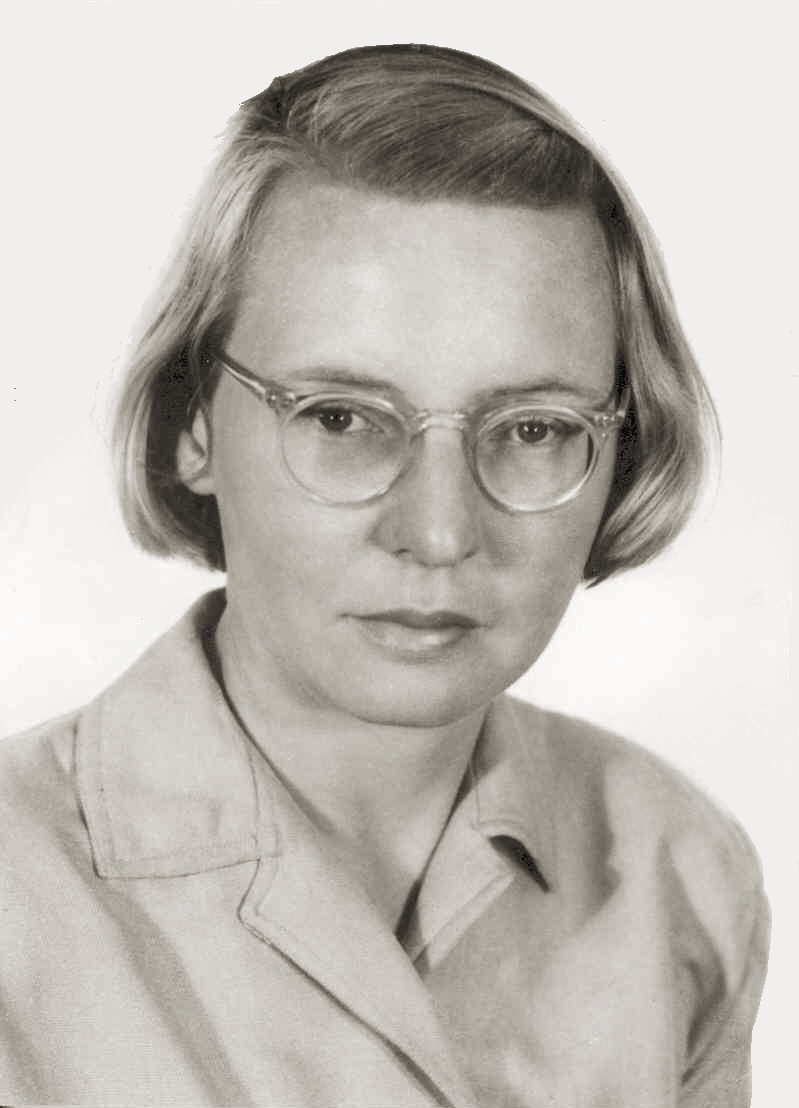
- Payne-Scott as a student in the 1930s, possibly while she was studying at the University of Sydney (1929–1932)
- Born: Ruby Violet Payne-Scott; 28 May 1912; Grafton, New South Wales, Australia
- Died: 25 May 1981 (aged 68); Mortdale, New South Wales, Australia
- Citizenship: Australian
- Education: University of Sydney
- Children: Peter Gavin Hall; Fiona Margaret Hall
- Scientific career
- Fields: Radio astronomy, radiophysics, Radio-frequency engineering
- Workplaces: CSIRO

Ruby Violet Payne-Scott (28 May 1912 – 25 May 1981) was an Australian pioneer in radiophysics and radio astronomy.

== Early life and education ==
Ruby Payne-Scott was born on 28 May 1912 in Grafton, New South Wales, the daughter of Cyril Payne-Scott and his wife Amy (née Neale). She later moved to Sydney to live with her aunt. There she attended the Penrith Public Primary School (1921–24), and the Cleveland-Street Girls' High School (1925–26), before completing her secondary schooling at Sydney Girls High School. Her school leaving certificate included honours in mathematics and botany.

She won two scholarships to undertake tertiary education at the University of Sydney, where she studied physics, chemistry, mathematics and botany. She earned a BSc in 1933—the third woman to graduate in physics there—followed by an MSc in physics in 1936 and a Diploma of Education in 1938.

== Early career ==
In 1936, Payne-Scott conducted research with William H. Love at the Cancer Research Laboratory at the University of Sydney. They determined that the magnetism of the Earth had little or no effect on the vital processes of beings living on the Earth by cultivating chicken embryos with no observable differences, despite being in magnetic fields up to 5,000 times as powerful as that of the Earth. Some decades earlier it was a widely held belief that the Earth's magnetic field produced extensive effects on human beings, and many people would sleep only with the head to the north and the body parallel to the magnetic meridian.

After her cancer research, she worked for a year and a term as a secondary school teacher at St Peter's Woodlands Grammar School from 1938 through 1939. Shortly after this, Payne-Scott joined AWA, a prominent electronics manufacturer and operator of two-way radio communications systems in Australia. Although originally hired as a librarian, her work quickly expanded to leading the measurements laboratory and performing electrical engineering research. She left AWA in August 1941, having grown displeased with its research environment.

== Contributions to radar and radio astronomy ==
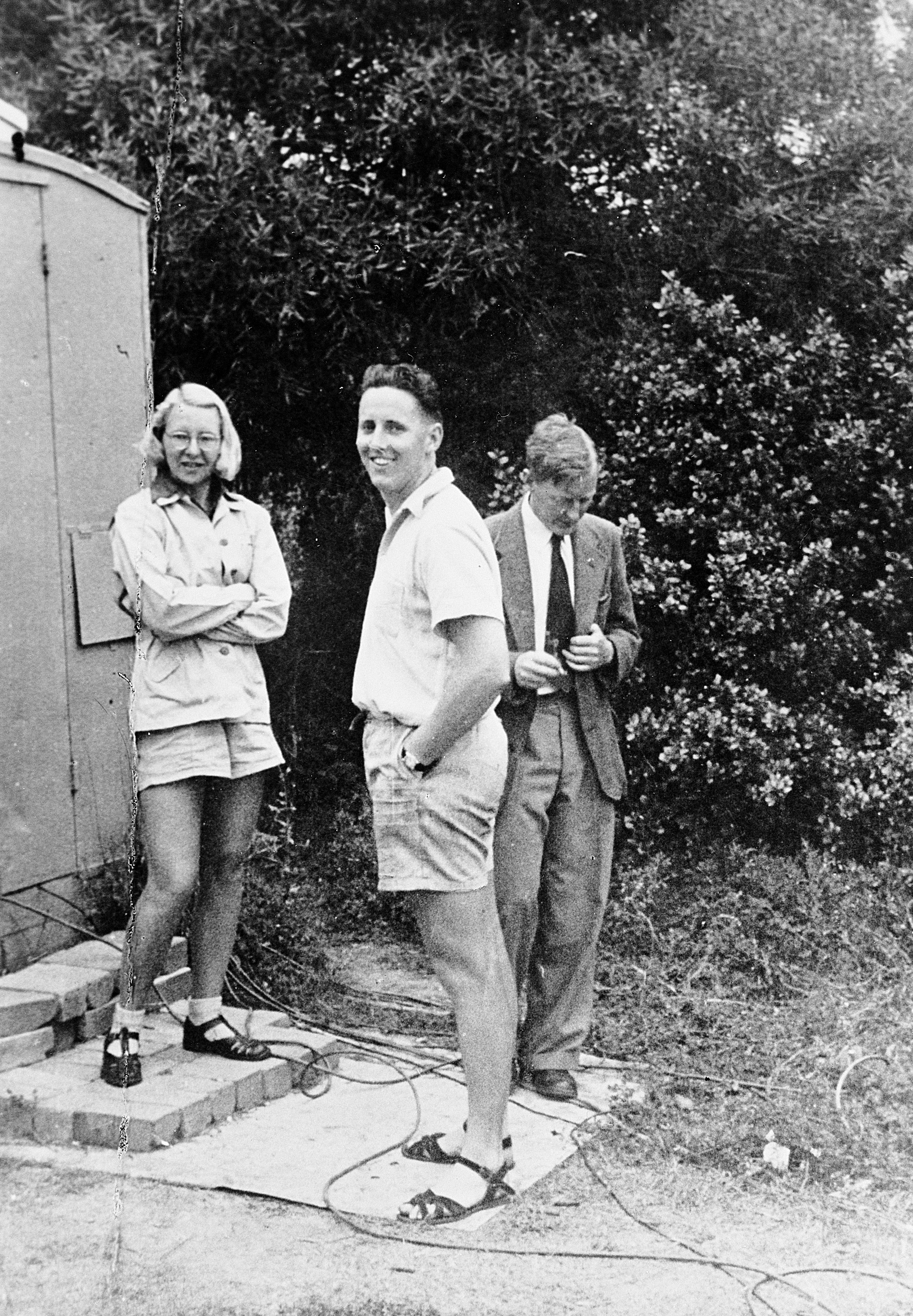
With Alec Little (middle) and "Chris" Christiansen at the Potts Hill Reservoir Division of Radiophysics field station in about 1948

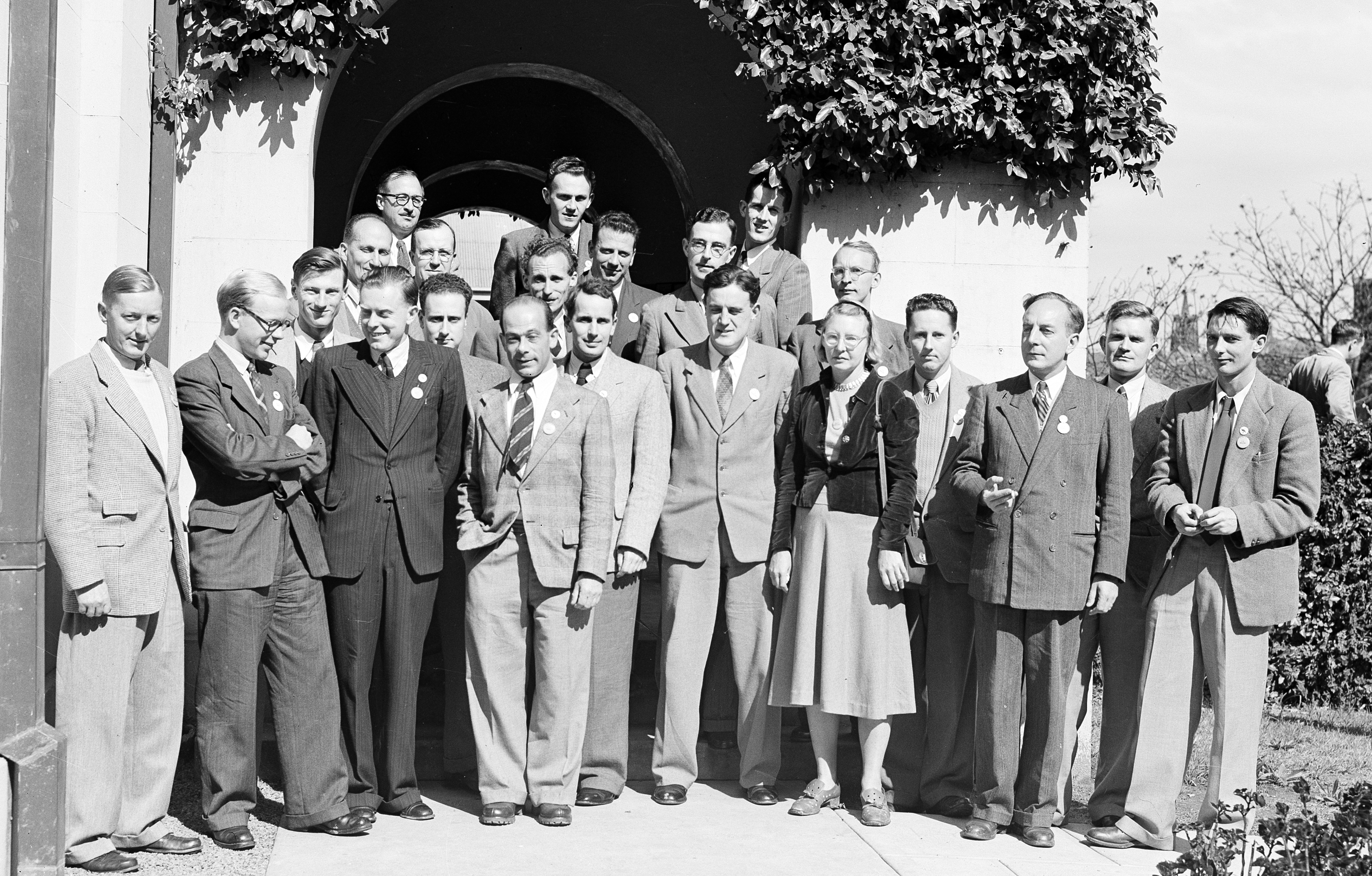
Participants in the International Union of Radio Science conference at the University of Sydney (1952). Payne-Scott is in the front row.

On 18 August 1941, Payne-Scott joined the Radiophysics Laboratory of the CSIRO. During World War II, she was engaged in top secret work investigating radar technology, becoming Australia's expert on the detection of aircraft using Plan Position Indicator (PPI) displays. After the war, in 1948, she published a comprehensive report on factors affecting visibility on PPI displays. She also made important contributions to prototype radar systems operating in the 25cm microwave band, achieving significant improvements.

As the focus of the Radiophysics Lab switched from developing radar systems to repurposing them for scientific pursuits, she was a major contributor to setting new goals. Payne-Scott's expertise as both a physicist and an electrical engineer distinguished her among her colleagues, most of whom lacked a formal physics education. In October 1945, together with Joe Pawsey, who acknowledged her potential in the field of radio astronomy and motivated her to apply her skills using radios techniques, and Lindsay McCready, she wrote to Nature documenting a connection between sunspots and increased radio emissions from the Sun (published February 1946).

In December 1945, she authored a summary of "all knowledge available and measurements taken" at the Radiophysics Lab, and suggested future research directions that "set the thinking" for the group.

In February 1946, Payne-Scott, McCready, and Pawsey made use of the sea-cliff location of their observation sites to perform the first radio interferometry for astronomical observations, their observations confirming that intense radio 'bursts' originated from the sunspots themselves. Their paper was also the first suggestion of Fourier synthesis in radio astronomy, an idea that hinted at the field's future of aperture synthesis.

From 1946 to 1951, Payne-Scott focused on these 'burst' radio emissions from the Sun, and is credited with discovering Type I and III bursts, and with gathering data that helped characterise Types II and IV. As part of this work, together with Alec Little, she designed and built a new 'swept-lobe' interferometer that could draw a map of solar radio emission strength and polarization once every second, and would automatically record to a movie camera whenever emissions reached a certain intensity.

== Forced Resignation and second career ==
Payne-Scott kept her 1944 marriage secret, as until 1966 women were forcibly 'retired' from continuing positions at CSIRO on marriage. She was outed in 1950, and was forced to resign and accept a short-term temporary position; her scientific career ended in 1951 after the birth of her first child, because her workplace did not offer maternity leave.

In August 1952, she returned briefly to radio astronomy, participating in the 10th International Union of Radio Science General Assembly at the University of Sydney.

From 1963 to 1974, Payne-Scott returned to teaching at Danebank School, in the southern Sydney suburb of Hurstville.

== Personal life ==
Payne-Scott was an atheist, a feminist, and an advocate for women's rights, and it was alleged a sometime member of the Communist Party of Australia. As a result, the Australian Security Intelligence Organisation (ASIO) created a substantial file on her activities, with some distortions.

She was a passionate bushwalker, a lover of cats, and also enjoyed knitting.

=== Family ===
Ruby Payne-Scott and William ("Bill") Holman Hall secretly married in 1944; at this time, the Commonwealth government had legislated for a marriage bar specifying that married women could not hold a permanent position within public service. She continued to work for CSIRO while secretly married, until the regulations of the new CSIRO in 1949 raised the issue of her marriage. The following year, her treatment by CSIRO resulted in hostile written exchanges with Sir Ian Clunies Ross (Chairman of CSIRO) about the status of married women in the work place. As a result, Payne-Scott lost her permanent position in CSIRO; however, her salary was maintained at a level comparable to that of her male colleagues. In 1951 – just a few months before her first child was born – Payne-Scott resigned her post due to there being no maternity leave available at the time.

On leaving her role at CSIRO – with her marriage to Bill having been exposed – Payne-Scott took her husband's name, and was then known as Ruby Hall. They had two children: Peter Gavin Hall – a mathematician who worked in theoretical statistics and probability theory; and Fiona Margaret Hall, an Australian artist whose career is described by Julie Ewington in her 2005 book, Fiona Hall.

=== Death and legacy ===
Ruby Payne-Scott died in Mortdale, on 25 May 1981, three days short of her 69th birthday. Towards the end of her life, Payne-Scott suffered from Alzheimer's disease. In 2018, the New York Times wrote a belated obituary for her, detailing how her work helped lay the foundation for a new field of science called radio astronomy.

In 2008, CSIRO acknowledged Payne-Scott's contribution to science, and established the Payne-Scott Award, intended "for researchers returning from family-related career breaks".

Danebank School, where she taught after her radio astronomy career, hosts an annual Ruby Payne-Scott Lecture "presented by outstanding women scientists in a variety of fields".

In 2017, the University of Sydney inaugurated the Payne-Scott Professorial Distinctions to honour distinguished professors for their contributions to the university across all areas of leadership, teaching and research.

In 2021, the Australian Academy of Science established the Ruby Payne-Scott Medal and Lecture for Women, to honour Australian pioneer women scientists.

In 2025, Transport for NSW named a Parramatta River class ferry the Ruby Payne-Scott as part of a set of five honouring prominent Sydney scientists and engineers. A tunnel boring machine used in New South Wales excavating the Metro West is named after her.

== Professional roles ==
- Research fellow, Cancer Research Committee, University of Sydney, 1932–35
- Woodlands Church of England Grammar School Glenelg (Adelaide) 1938–1939.
- Engineer, AWA Ltd, 1939–41.
- Division of Radiophysics, CSIR (now CSIRO), 1941–51.
- Home duties 1951–63.
- Mathematics/science teacher, Danebank Church of England School, Sydney, 1963–74.

== Publications ==
- "Moonlight on the Nepean". Nepean Times. Penrith, NSW: National Library of Australia. 29 December 1923. p. 4.
- "Relative intensity of spectral lines in indium and gallium". Nature, 131 (1933), 365–366.
- (With W.H. Love) "Tissue cultures exposed to the influence of a magnetic field". Nature, 137 (1936), 277.
- "Notes on the use of photographic films as a means of measuring gamma ray dosage". Sydney University. Cancer Research Committee Journal, 7 (1936), 170–175.
- Payne-Scott, Ruby Violet (1936), The wave-length distribution of the acattered radiation in a medium traversed by a beam of x or gamma rays (MSc thesis) (Thesis), University of Sydney
- The wavelength distribution of the scattered radiation in a medium traversed by a beam of X or gamma rays. British Journal of Radiology, N.S., 10 (1937), 850–870.
- (With A. L. Green) "Superheterodyne tracking charts". II. A.W.A. Technical Review, 5 (1941), 251–274; Wireless Engineer, 19 (1942), 290–302.
- "A note on the design of iron-cored coils at audio frequencies". A.W.A. Technical Review, 6 (1943), 91–96.
- Eight unpublished classified technical reports at the Division of Radiophyiscs during World War II including Pawsey and Payne-Scott from 1944 : Measurements of the noise level picked up by an S-band aerial. CSIR Radiophysics Laboratory Report, RP 209 (1944).
- "Solar and cosmic radio frequency radiation; survey of knowledge available and measurements taken at Radiophysics Laboratory to Dec. 1, 1945". CSIR Radiophysics Laboratory Report SRP 501/27 (1945).
- (With J. L. Pawsey and L. L. McCready) "Radio-frequency energy from the sun". Nature, 157 (1946), 158.
- 'A study of solar radio frequency radiation on several frequencies during the sunspot of July–August 1946. CSIR Radiophyscis Laboratory Report, RPL 9 (1947).
- McCready, L.L., J.L. Pawsey, and Ruby Payne-Scott. "Solar radiation at radio frequencies and its relation to sunspots." Proceedings of the Royal Society of London. Series A. Mathematical and Physical Sciences 190.1022 (1947): 357–375.
- (With D. E. Yabsley and J. G. Bolton) "Relative times of arrival of bursts of solar noise on different radio frequencies". Nature, 160 (1947), 256.
- "The visibility of small echoes on radar PPI displays". Proceedings of the Institute of Radio Engineers, 36 (1948), 180.
- "Solar Noise Records taken during 1947 and 1948". CSIR Radiophysics Laboratory Report. RPL 30 (1948).
- (With L.L. McCready) "Ionospheric effects noted during dawn observations on solar noise". Terrestrial Magnetism and Atmospheric Electricity, 53 (1948), 429.
- "Bursts of solar radiation at metre wavelengths". Australian Journal of Scientific Research (A), 2 (1949), 214.
- "The noise-like character of solar radiation at metre wavelengths". Australian Journal of Scientific Research (A), 2 (1949), 228.
- "Some characteristics of non-thermal solar radiation at metre wave-lengths". Journal of Geophysical Research, 55 (1950), 233. (In collection of papers Summary of Proceedings of Australian National Committee of Radio Science, URSI, Sydney, 16–20 January 1950)
- (With A. G. Little) "The position and movement on the solar disk of sources of radiation at a frequency of 97 Mc/s. I. Equipment". Australian Journal of Scientific Research (A), 4 (1951), 489.
- (With A. G. Little) "The positions and movement on the solar disk of sources of radiation at a frequency of 97 Mc/s II. Noise Storms". Australian Journal of Scientific Research (A), 4 (1951), 508.
- (With A. G. Little) "The position and movement on the solar disk of sources of radiation at a frequency of 97 Mc/s. III. Outbursts". Aust. J. of Scientific Research A, 5 (1952), 32.

== See also ==
- Joan Maie Freeman
- Rachel Makinson
- Joseph Lade Pawsey
