= Gordon J. Stanley =

New Zealand-born radio astronomer

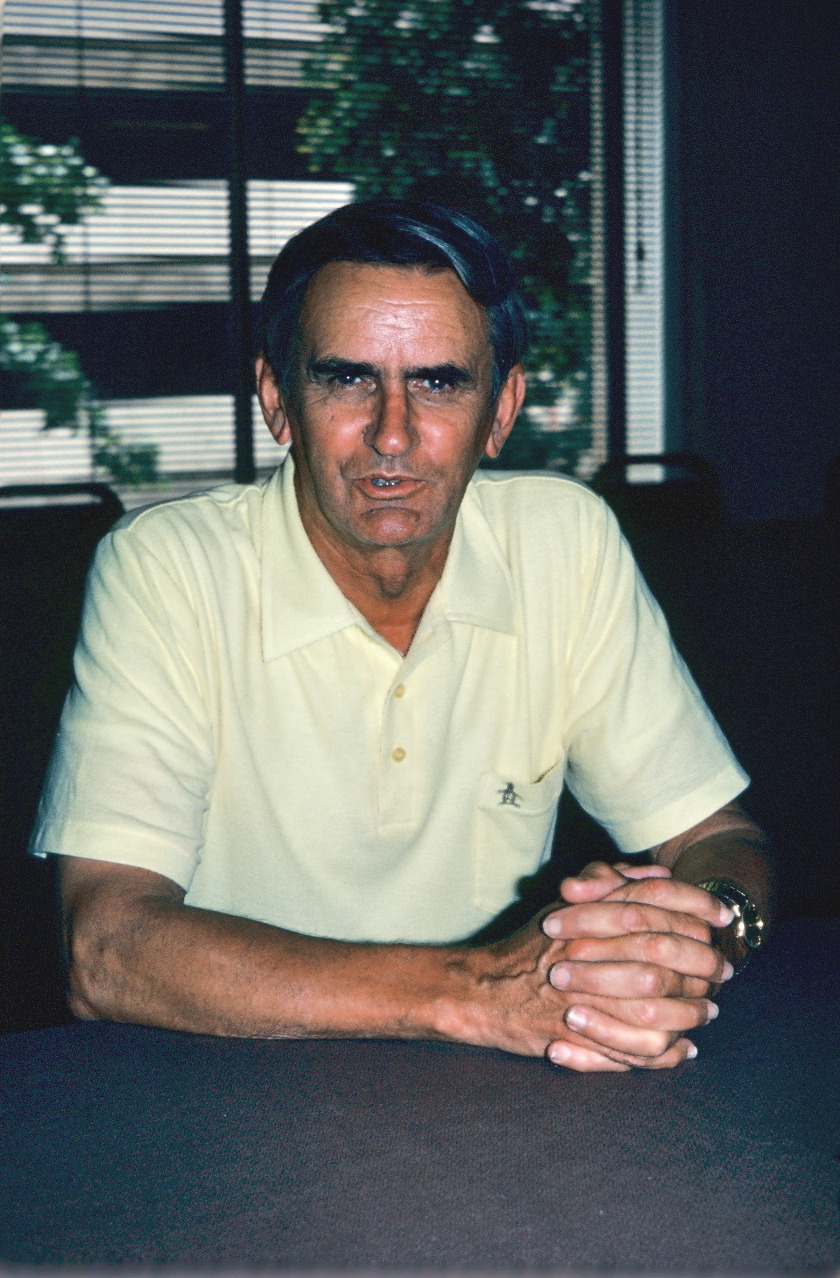
- Stanley in 1981
- Born: 1 July 1921; Cambridge, New Zealand
- Died: 17 December 2001 (aged 80)
- Known for: Discovering Cygnus A
- Scientific career
- Fields: Radio astronomy

Gordon J. Stanley (1 July 1921 – 17 December 2001) was a New Zealand-born radio astronomer who with John G. Bolton in 1947, discovered the first radio star, Cygnus A.

Stanley was born in Cambridge, New Zealand. By the 1940s he was working in radio astronomy with Bolton, where they discovered the first radio star.

In 1955 Stanley went to the California Institute of Technology (Caltech) where he became the director of the Owens Valley Radio Observatory.

== Sources ==
- "Gordon Stanley, 80; Built, Directed Radio Observatory at Caltech", LA Times, 31 December 2001
- Ken Kellerman, et al. Gordon James Stanley and the early developments of Radio Astronomy in Australia. doi:10.1071/AS04008
- World Book, 1967 edition, Vol. 1, p. 803.
