= Dover Heights =

- Suburb
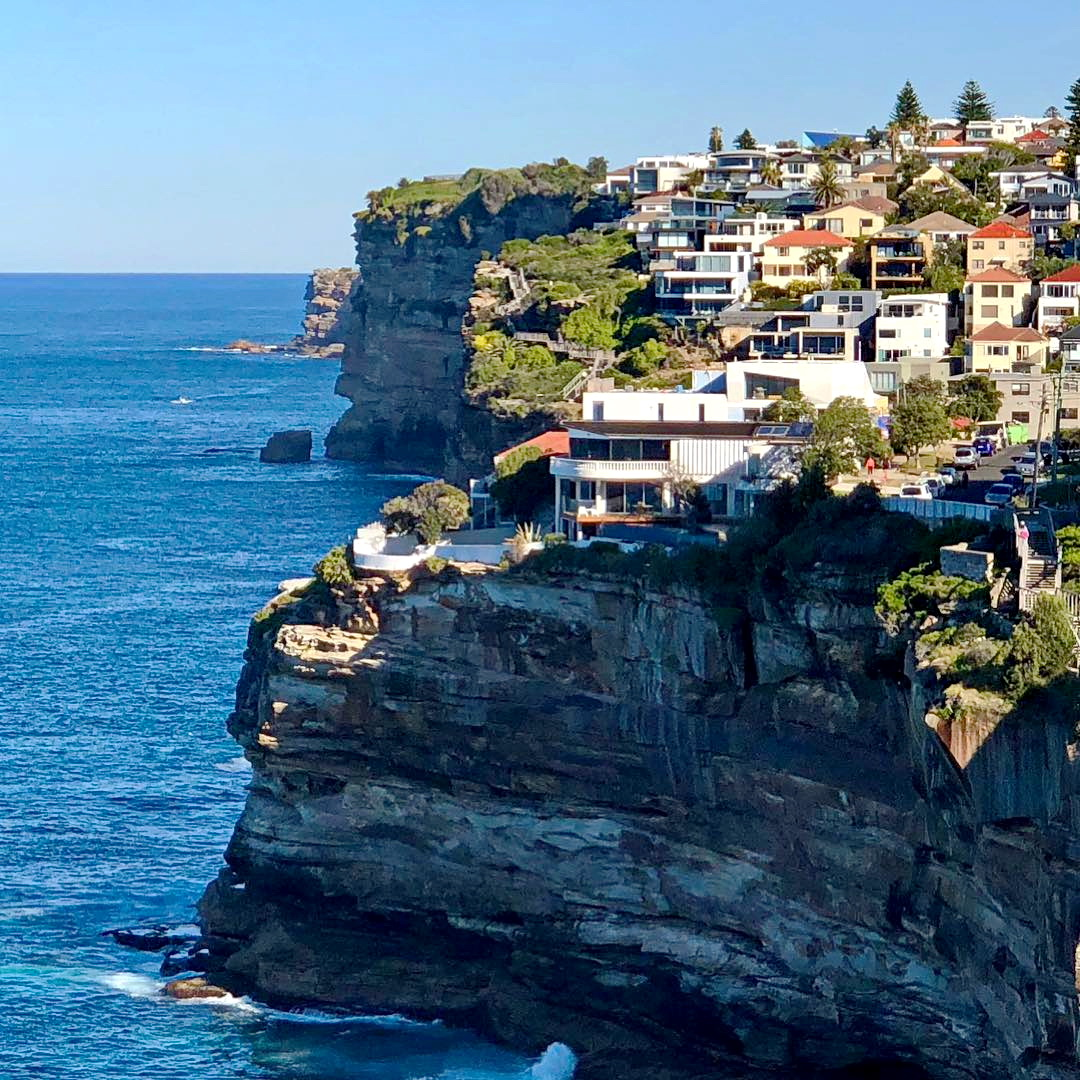
- Dover Heights with the Tasman Sea on the left

- Interactive map of Dover Heights
- Country: Australia
- State: New South Wales
- City: Sydney
- LGA: Waverley Council
- Location: 9 km (5.6 mi) from Sydney CBD

Government
  - State electorate: Vaucluse
  - Federal division: Wentworth
- Elevation: 85 m (279 ft)

Population
  - Total: 4,044 (2021 census)
- Postcode: 2030
Suburbs around Dover Heights
Rose Bay	Vaucluse
Rose Bay	Dover Heights	Tasman Sea
North Bondi	North Bondi

Dover Heights is a cliffside eastern suburb of Sydney, in the state of New South Wales, Australia. Dover Heights is 9 kilometres east of the Sydney central business district, in the local government area of Waverley Council. Its postcode is 2030, shared with Vaucluse and Watsons Bay.

== Location ==
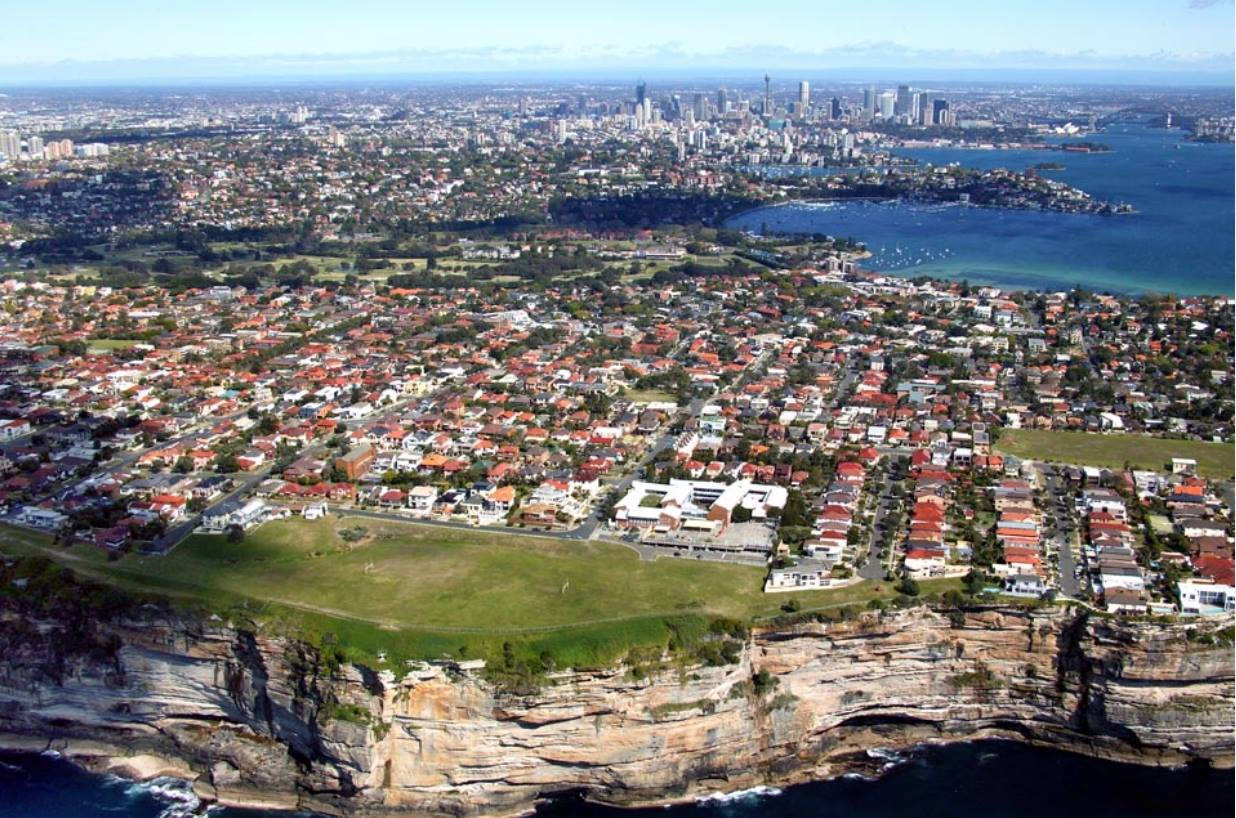
Dover Heights Coastal Reserves With View Towards Harbor & CBD

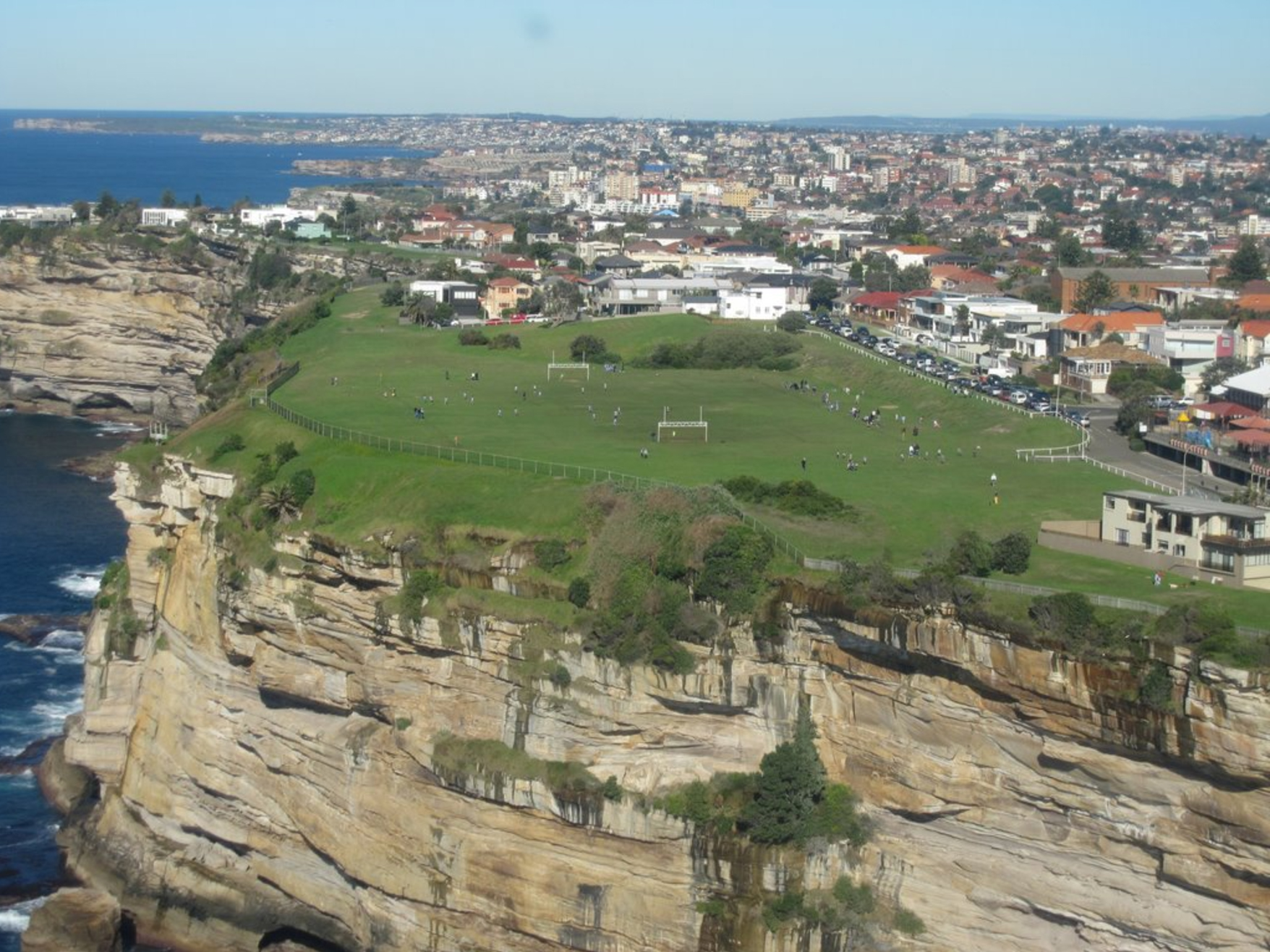
Dover Heights Coastal Reserves – Rodney Reserve Playing Field Looking Towards Bondi

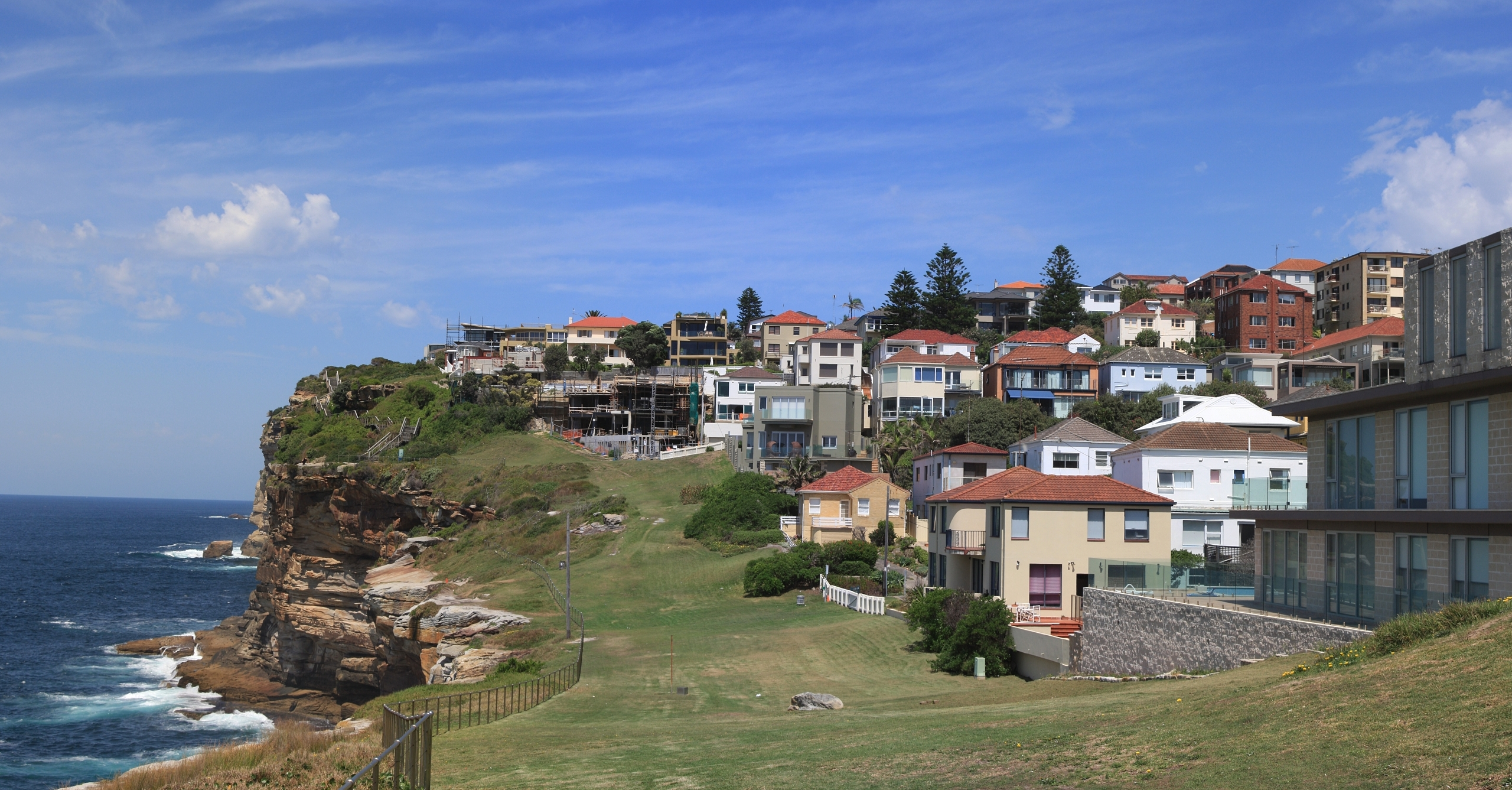
Eastern Ave Reserve Looking South

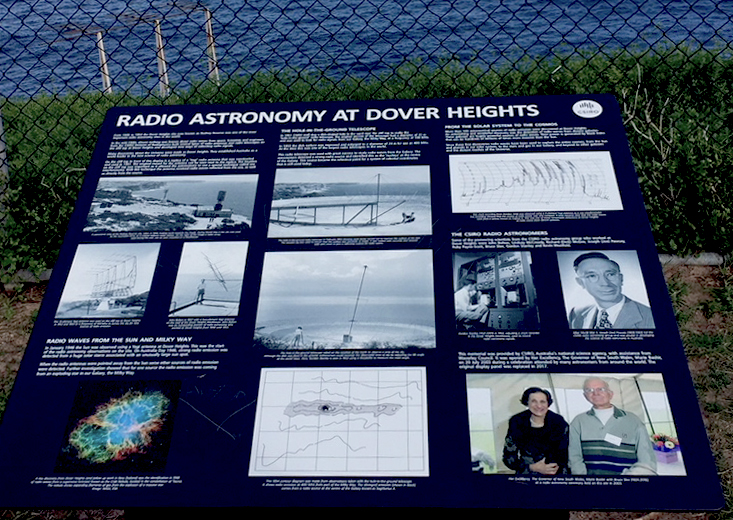
CSIRO Plaque Commemorating Radio Astronomy History in Dover Heights

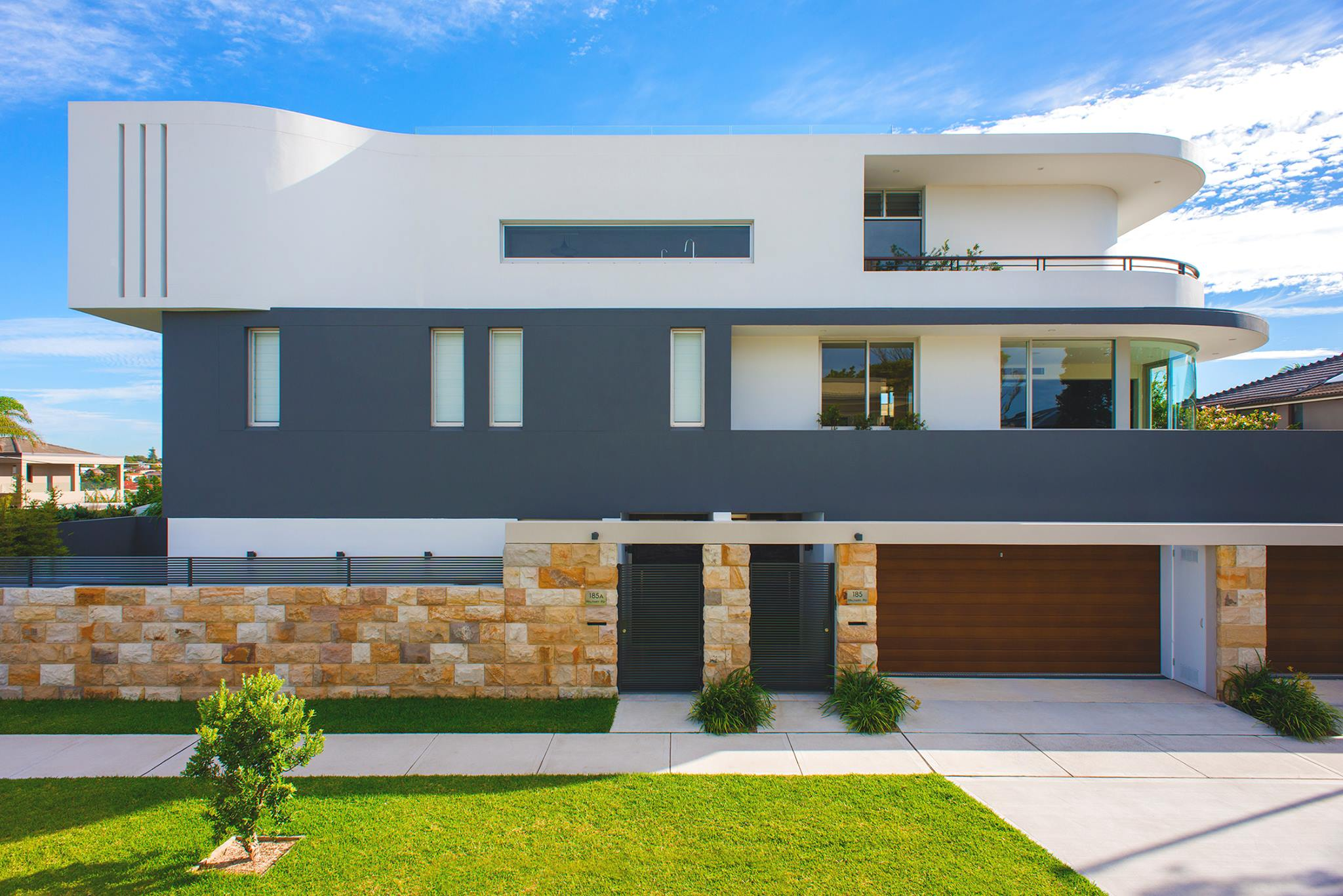
The Wave – Dover Heights

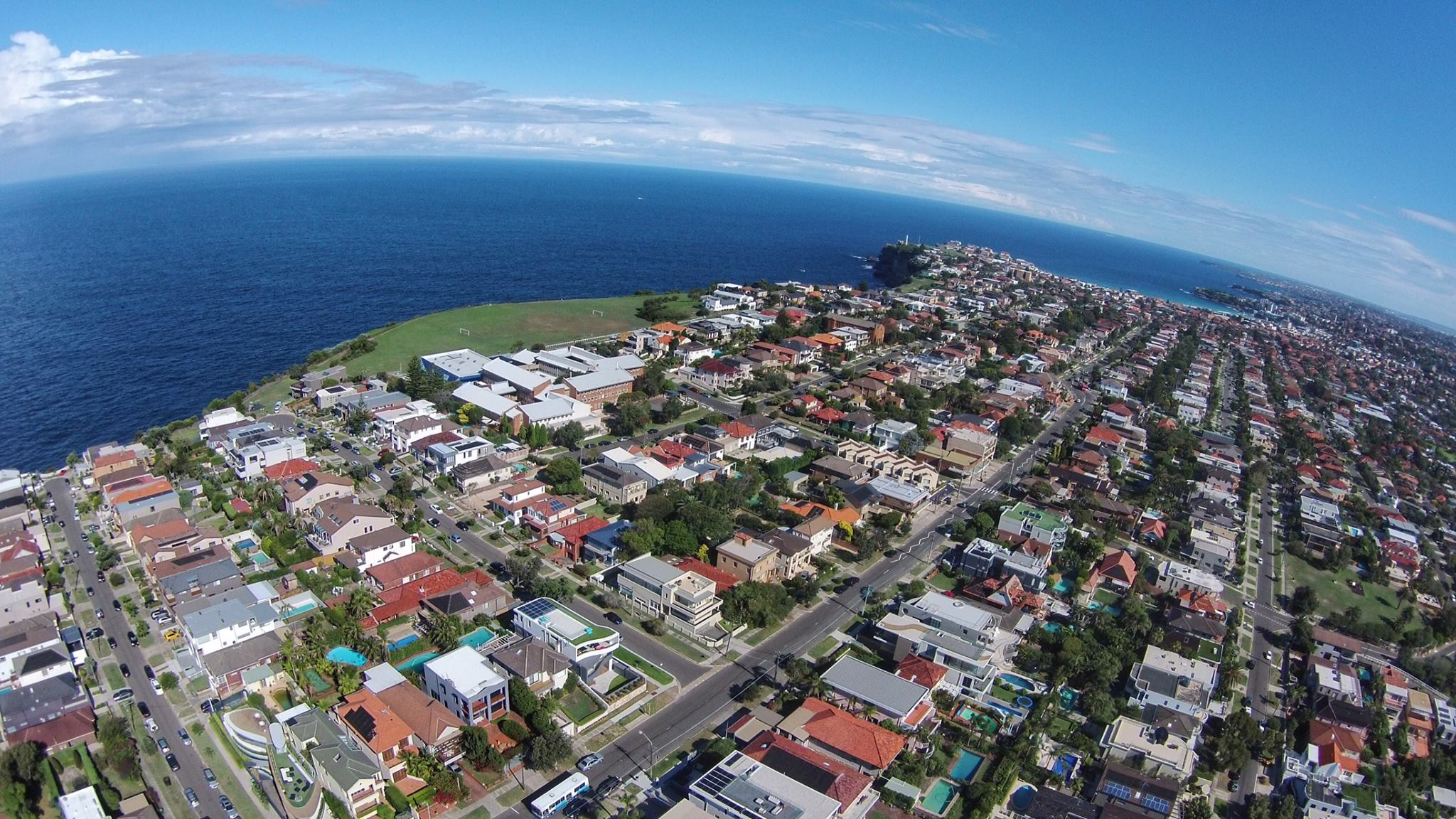
Aerial view of Dover Heights Myuna Road, Military Road & Portland Street

Dover Heights borders Vaucluse to its north, North Bondi to its south and Rose Bay to its west and has the Pacific Ocean to its east.

Dover Heights is a mainly residential suburb. Many of the suburb's properties have views of Sydney Harbour and the Sydney Harbour Bridge. Some properties have both harbour and ocean views. Dudley Page Reserve has panoramic views over Sydney Harbour and is a popular site for sunsets and picnics. The Dover Heights Coastal Reserves are part of the Bondi to Watsons Bay Cliff Walk and have stunning ocean views. The Dover Heights Coastal Reserves are formed by the contiguous Weonga Reserve, Rodney Reserve and Raleigh Reserve.

The suburb is considered to be the most affluent within the Waverley Local Government Area, and amongst the most affluent suburbs in Australia. This is reflected in property prices – like nearby suburbs Vaucluse and Bellevue Hill, median house prices are above A$6.4 million. The ATO's 2014–2015 taxation statistics listed Dover Height's postcode, 2030 as the second richest in Australia with an average taxable income of $185,684. Dover Heights shares the 2030 postcode with the neighbouring suburbs of Rose Bay North, Vaucluse & Watsons Bay.

== History ==
Dover Heights is believed to have been named for its cliffs along the Pacific Ocean which resembled those found at Dover, in Kent, England. The first mention of Dover Heights appeared in municipal records in 1886. The area was first used for market gardens.

In 1830, land in the area was owned by Daniel Cooper (1785–1853), a partner in the firm Cooper and Levey, who owned the Waterloo Stores. The retailing emporium was located on the corner of George Street and Market Street in the city, on the site that was later occupied by Gowings Brothers retailers until 2006. The Dover Heights area was subdivided in 1913.

== Population ==
At the 2021 census, there were 4,044 residents in Dover Heights. 55.7% of people were born in Australia. The most common other countries of birth were South Africa 14.3% and England 3.3%. 76.6% of people only spoke English at home. Other languages spoken at home included Russian 3.3% and Mandarin 2.9%. The most common responses for religion were Judaism 49.9%, No Religion 19.5% and Catholic 11.1%. According to the demographic community profile of id.com.au created from the 2016 census, Dover Heights is the suburb with the highest Jewish population by percent in Australia.

The median weekly household income was $3,877 and 61.2% of households had a weekly income of more than $3,000. Housing costs were high in Dover Heights with the median monthly mortgage payment being $4,333.

== Architecture ==
With both cliff top and city views, Dover Heights has a number of homes of architectural interest which have received awards

The Butterfly House – 197 Military Road, Dover Heights - designed by award-winning architect Ed Lippmann

Moebius House – 129 Military Road, Dover Heights - designed by architect Tony Owen

Light House – 10 Wentworth Street, Dover Heights - designed by architect Peter Stutchbury

Winner of the Wilkinson Award by the Royal Australian Institute of Architects in 2015

The Cliff House – 8 Wentworth Street, Dover Heights

The Wave Dover Heights – 185/185A Military Road – designed by architects Paul Brough & Andre Baroukh

Winner of the 2015 Master Builders Association Award of Australia – National Medium Density – 2 to 5 Dwellings

Winner of the 2015 Master Builders Association NSW Award For Town House / Villas / Dual Occupancy Over $1,000,000

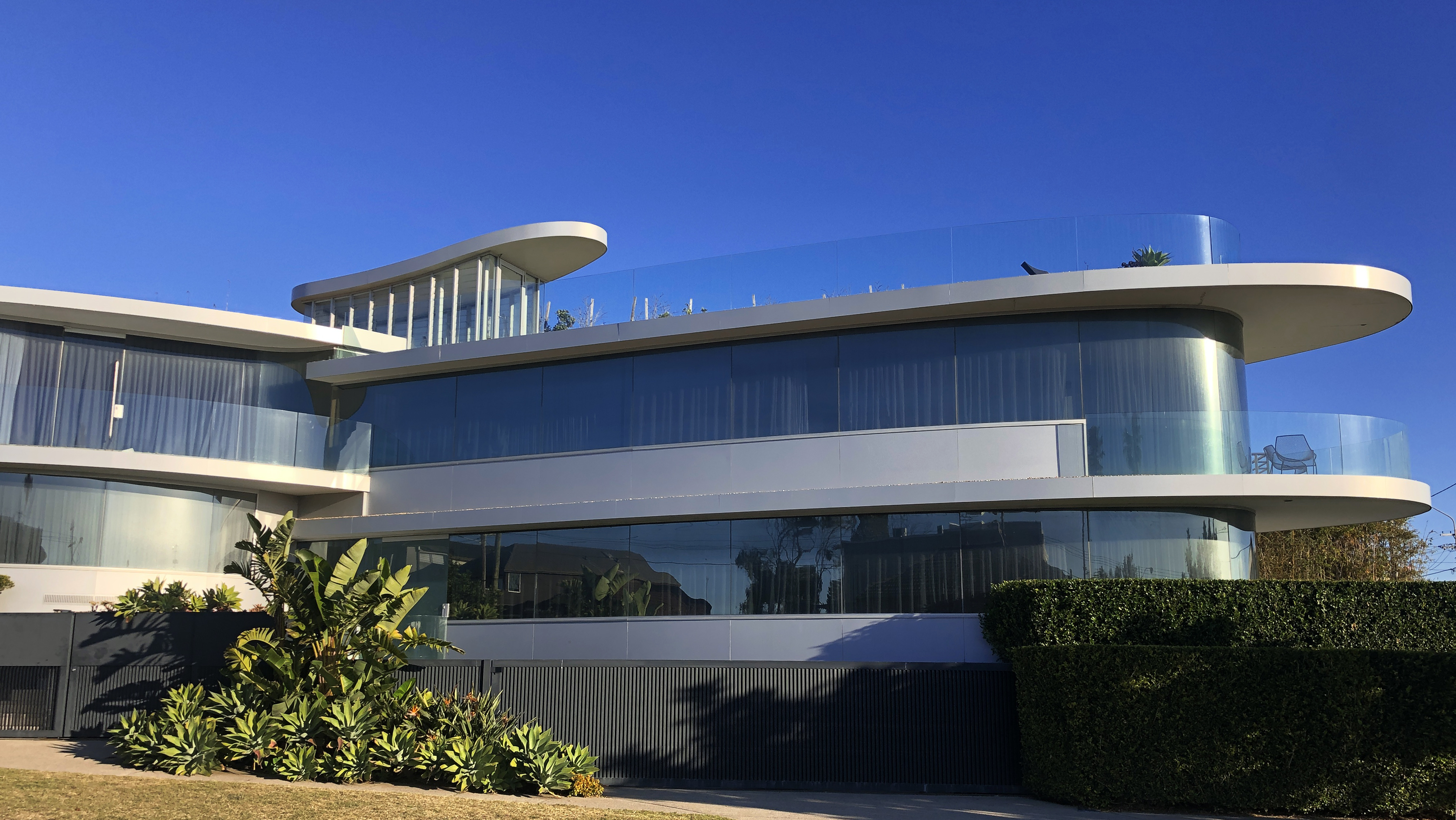
The Butterfly House - Dover Heights

The Holman House – 20 Hunter Street, Dover Heights

Winner of the Wilkinson Award by the Royal Australian Institute of Architects in 2005

Other properties of architectural note:

1 George Street – Dover Heights

21 Hunter Street – Dover Heights

57 Eastern Ave, Dover Heights

12 Douglas Parade, Dover Heights

== Radio astronomy ==
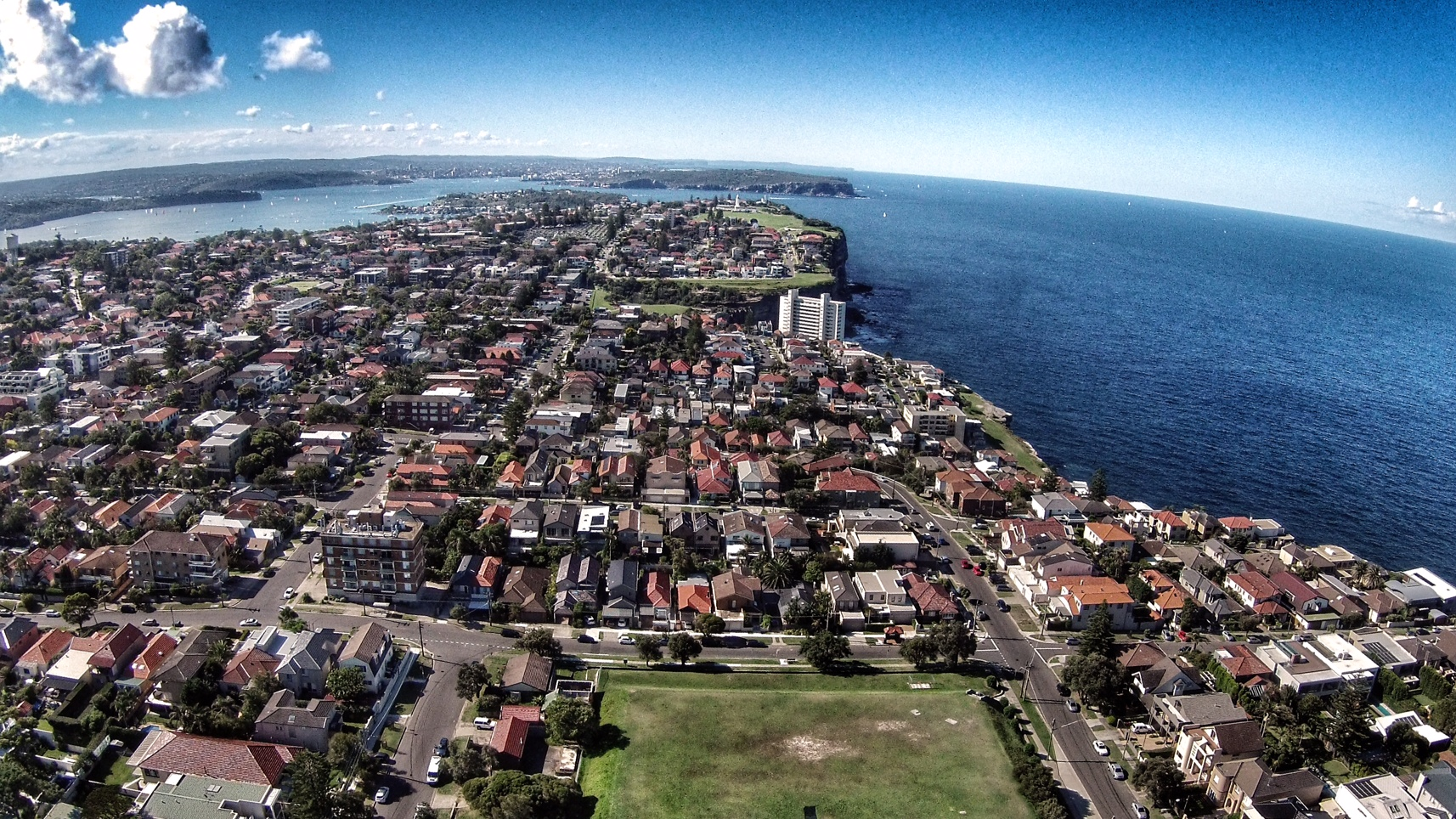
Dudley Page Reserve With View to North Head

During the Second World War, Rodney Reserve, at the Dover Heights clifftop, was used by the Royal Australian Air Force for coastal defence radar. The CSIRO further used the site for pioneering experimentation in radio astronomy related to galactic radio emissions, with a team including John Gatenby Bolton first observing solar emissions in 1945. The site primarily made use of Yagi antennas. The first radio source they identified with something that could be seen was in the constellation Taurus, and named Taurus A, which is in fact the Crab Nebula, a supernova remnant (the remains of an exploding star) first reported by Chinese astronomers in the year 1054.
