= Sea interferometry =

Sea interferometry, also known as sea-cliff interferometry, is a form of radio astronomy that uses radio waves reflected off the sea to produce an interference pattern. It is the radio wave analogue to Lloyd's mirror. The technique was invented and exploited in Australia between 1945 and 1948.

== Process ==
A radio detecting antenna is placed on top of a cliff, which detects radio propagation coming directly from the source and radio waves reflected off the water surface. The two sets of waves are then combined to form an interference pattern such as that produced by two separate aerials. The reflected wavefront travels an additional distance 2h sin(i) before reaching the detector where h and i are the height of the cliff and the inclination (or altitude angle) of the incoming wavefront respectively. It acts as a second aerial twice the height of the cliff below the first.

Sea interferometers are drift instruments, that is, they are fixed and their pointing direction changes with the rotation of the Earth. The interference patterns for a sea interferometer commence sharply as soon as the source rises above the horizon, instead of fading in gradually as for a normal interferometer. Since it consists of just one detector, there is no need for connecting cables or for preamplifiers. A sea interferometer also has double the sensitivity of a pair of detectors set up to the same separation. Sea interferometry greatly increases the resolving power of the instrument.

== Data quality ==
The quality of data obtained by a sea interferometer is affected by a number of factors. Wind waves on the water surface and variable atmospheric refraction adversely affect the signal, and the curvature of Earth must be taken into account. These difficulties can be overcome by observing for extended periods, and calibrating the instrument on sources of known position.

== Discoveries ==
Among the discoveries made using sea interferometry are that sunspots emit strong radio waves Early sea-interferometer observations in Australia also localized solar radio emission to regions associated with large sunspot groups, demonstrating the usefulness of interferometric methods for determining the positions of radio sources on the Sun.

and that the source of radio wave emission from Cygnus A is small (less than 8 arcminutes in diameter). The technique also discovered six new sources including Centaurus A.
