= Isabel Gal =

Jewish Hungarian paediatrician

Dr Isabel Gal
- Born: 1925
- Died: 2017 (aged 91–92); London
- Citizenship: United Kingdom
- Education: University of Budapest; University of Edinburgh Medical School
- Known for: Paediatrician known for establishing the link between hormonal pregnancy tests and severe birth defects.

Isabel Gal (1925–2017), was a Jewish Hungarian paediatrician who was responsible for highlighting the link between use of the hormonal pregnancy test Primodos and severe birth defects.

== Early life and education ==
Born in Hungary in 1926, Isabel was the daughter of Geza Gunsberger, a merchant from Papa, Hungary, and Irma Hacker, from Austria. Gunsberger worked first for a timber merchant and later founded a lingerie company. During the Holocaust, Gunsberger was deported to Auschwitz concentration camp. He later died in Buchenwald concentration camp. Isabel, along with her mother and sisters, Erica and Lia, were sent to Auschwitz concentration camp, all four survived the war. After the war, Isabel returned to Hungary and studied medicine at the University of Budapest. Qualifying as a doctor, she worked as a paediatrician at Bokay children's hospital in Budapest.

In 1953, she married Endre Gal, a mathematician, whose father was a timber merchant who Isabel's father had previously worked for, and in 1956 the couple's daughter Katinka was born. Later in 1956, with the Hungarian Revolution underway, the family left Hungary together with Isabel's mother Irma, and fled through Austria to England where Erica had settled after the war.

== Career ==
In the UK, Gal retrained as a doctor at University of Edinburgh Medical School and her husband taught mathematics at Imperial College London. After re-qualifying Gal worked as a paediatrician at Great Ormond Street Hospital in London, and Queen Mary’s Hospital for Children in Surrey, and as a clinical lecturer at the Institute of Obstetrics and Genealogy, at Imperial College London. Throughout her career Gal published extensively on pregnancy tests, oral contraceptives and vitamin A.

== Primodos ==
In 1967, while working at Queen Mary's Hospital for Children, Gal published an article in the journal Nature, highlighting a potential link between the hormone-based pregnancy test Primodos, manufactured by German drug company Schering AG, and congenital birth malformations. Gal found that from a group of 100 women who had babies born with spina bifida, 19 had taken Primodos, whereas in a control group of 100 women with healthy babies, only four had used the drug. She hypothesised that the high dose of hormone in the pregnancy test, might have interfered with the foeto-placental unit. In the article, Gal also noted that the pregnancy test used the same components as oral contraceptive pills which might also constitute a similar risk.

Gal took her findings to the Department of Health and the Committee on Safety of Medicines however neither Schering nor the UK government acted on her research. It was not until 1975, when further evidence emerged supporting her findings, that the Committee on Safety of Medicines issued a warning about use of the drug, and it was 1978 before Schering withdrew the Primodos, by which time it had already been banned in several other countries. One reason for this inaction was that the government did not want to discourage women from taking the newly available oral contraceptive pill. In a 1997 book, Bill Inman who had been Senior Medical Officer at the UK Department of Health and Social Security at the time and who corresponded with Gal about her findings, wrote:

On the one hand we had Dr. Gal's suspicion of a possible danger to the foetus and, on the other hand, a very real danger that publicity might cause a woman to stop using oral contraceptives or other preparations that were important in the treatment of a variety of gynaecological disorders. I was advised not to discuss these possibilities with anybody in case the idea that the HPT problem might have much wider repercussions inadvertently slipped out, though I can hardly believe that many people would not have thought of it themselves.

in 2017, Inman was found to have destroyed documents relating to the case.

Gal believed that she was discriminated against and blacklisted for voicing her concerns about hormonal pregnancy tests and their potential link to the oral contraceptive pill. Her position Queen Mary's was terminated, she was unsuccessful in securing another senior post and eventually left the medical profession.

An Independent Medicines and Medical Devices Safety Review, led by Baroness Cumberlege, published in 2020, vindicated Gal's original research, finding that "avoidable harm" resulted from the use of Primodos, and concluding that the drug should have been withdrawn from use in 1967.

== Later life and death ==
Later in life Gal lived with her husband Endre in Teddington, south west London. She died in 2017 at the age of 92.

== Media ==
Thames Television produced a documentary titled The Primodos Affair in 1980, and in 2020, Sky News produced a documentary titled Bitter Pill: Primodos, which highlighted Gal's role in identifying the dangers of the drug.
