= Primodos =

Hormone-based pregnancy test

- Purpose: Determine if pregnancy is present

Norethisterone

Ethinylestradiol

Primodos ingredients

Primodos was a hormone-based pregnancy test, used in the 1960s and 1970s, which consisted of two pills that contained norethisterone (as acetate) and ethinylestradiol. It detected pregnancy by inducing menstruation in women who were not pregnant. The presence or absence of menstrual bleeding was then used to determine whether the user was pregnant. In South Korea it was also used, "perhaps as a double dose", to induce abortions. It was produced by Schering AG, a German company subsequently (in 2006) taken over by Bayer AG.

While first made available for sale in the UK in 1959, it was withdrawn from sale in the UK in 1978.

Another hormonal pregnancy test called Duogynon was in use in Germany during the same general time period.

== History ==
In the 1960s, Isabel Gal conducted research at Queen Mary's Hospital for Children that showed a link between use of the drug and severe birth defects. A review by the Committee on Safety of Medicines in the 1970s concluded that the product should not be used by pregnant women. Litigation in the 1980s regarding these claims ended inconclusively; the proceedings were discontinued, with the court's approval. A review of the matter by the Medicines and Healthcare products Regulatory Agency in 2014 assessed the studies performed to date, and concluded that it found the evidence for adverse effects to be inconclusive.

The report of an expert working group of the UK Commission on Human Medicines published in November 2017 concluded there was no "causal association" between Primodos and severe disabilities in babies. The expert group recommended that families who took a hormone pregnancy test and experienced "an adverse pregnancy outcome" should be offered genetic testing to establish whether there was a different underlying cause.

== Reception ==
The Independent Medicines and Medical Devices Safety Review, chaired by Baroness Cumberlege, reported in 2020 that "avoidable harm" resulted from the use of Primodos. It recommended that "the Government should immediately issue a fulsome apology on behalf of the healthcare system to the families affected by Primodos".

Dr Bill Inman, of the Committee on Safety of Medicines, who had investigated Primodos was referenced in a Schering memo stating "he has destroyed all the material on which his investigation is based, or made it unrecognizable, which makes it impossible to trace the individual cases taken into the investigation. I understood Dr. Inman that he did this to prevent individual claims from using this material."

Baroness Cumberlege said, in relation to Bayer, "I think they should not only apologise; they should recognise what has happened and give ex-gratia payments to these people who have suffered."
