= Rachel Lowe (disambiguation) =

Rachel Lowe may refer to:

- Rachel Lowe (born 1977), English board game developer
- Rachel Lowe (artist) (born 1968), British artist and filmmaker
- Rachel Lowe (soccer) (born 19 November 2000), Australian soccer player
