= Destination London =

Destination London may refer to:

- Agent Cody Banks 2: Destination London, a 2004 film starring Frankie Muniz
- Destination (game), one of a set of board games by RTL games
