= D. J. Finney =

British statistician

David John Finney CBE FRS FRSE (3 January 1917 – 12 November 2018) was a British statistician and Professor Emeritus of Statistics at the University of Edinburgh. He was Director of the Agricultural Research Council's Unit of Statistics from 1954 to 1984 and a former President of the Royal Statistical Society and of the Biometric Society. He was a pioneer in the development of systematic monitoring of drugs for detection of adverse reactions. He turned 100 in January 2017 and died on 12 November 2018 at the age of 101 following a short illness.

== Childhood and education ==
Finney was born in Latchford, Cheshire, Warrington. In his interview with MacNeill, Finney describes his background: "My family were never wealthy but never in want". His paternal grandfather was a schoolmaster, and his father was an accountant in the steel industry. David was the eldest child; he had no sisters. In the Preface to his "Probit Analysis" book, Finney thanks his father Robt. G. S. Finney for assistance.

Finney was educated at the coeducational Lymm Grammar School and Manchester Grammar School, where he won a Cambridge scholarship. He read mathematics and statistics at Clare College, Cambridge from 1934 to 1938. He was awarded a postgraduate scholarship for statistical work in agriculture under Ronald Fisher at the Galton Laboratory, University College London, where he worked on statistical estimation for human genetics.

== Career ==
He became assistant to Frank Yates at Rothamsted Experimental Station in 1939, where there was great emphasis on increasing productivity of agriculture and he was involved in the design of field experiments and the interpretation of their results. In 1945, he joined the University of Oxford as the first holder of the post of Lecturer in the Design and Analysis of Scientific Experiment. He married in 1950 and with his wife and 9-month-old daughter, left Oxford in 1952 for New Delhi where, for a year, he acted as a consultant to the United Nations Food and Agriculture Organisation on the development of the Indian Agricultural Statistics Research Institute in New Delhi. In 1951 he was elected as a Fellow of the American Statistical Association. He became a Fellow of The Royal Society of Edinburgh in 1955.

After returning from India, he moved to the University of Aberdeen where he became Reader in Statistics and also established a Unit of Statistics funded by the Agricultural Research Council, which was to provide a service for Scotland modelled on that provided by Rothamsted for England. The Agricultural Research Council moved the Unit of Statistics to the University of Edinburgh in 1966 and Finney, who moved to Edinburgh with it, became the first Professor of Statistics at the university and well as being the Director of the Unit of Statistics. He served as president of the Royal Statistical Society in 1973–4. He retired from his position at Edinburgh in 1984.

During the 1960s he became involved in the field of drug safety, providing important advice both to the fledgling UK system of medicines safety and to efforts by WHO to create an international system of pharmacovigilance. In 2002 he returned to contact with the Uppsala Monitoring Centre, which published an anthology of his writings about statistical methods and drug safety. He was also involved with Bill Inman in the setting-up of the Drug Safety Research Unit. Finney received an Honorary Doctorate from Heriot-Watt University in 1981. In 1981, Finney became a founding member of the World Cultural Council.

== Works ==
- Probit Analysis, Cambridge University Press, 1947
- Statistical methods in biological assay, Hafner, 1952; Griffin, 1971, ISBN 978-0-85264-014-2
- Experimental design and its statistical basis, University of Chicago Press, 1955
- Statistics for mathematicians: an introduction, Oliver & Boyd, 1968
