= Asscher =

Asscher may refer to:

- Royal Asscher Diamond Company, a Dutch diamond-cutting company and inventor of the Asscher cut

== People ==
- Abraham Asscher (1880–1950), Dutch Jewish businessman
- Lodewijk Asscher (born 1974), Dutch politician
- William Asscher (1930-2014), consultant nephrologist, active in the United Kingdom

== See also ==
- Asher, the second son of Jacob and Zilpah in the Book of Genesis
