= Schering AG =

German multinational pharmaceutical company

Coordinates: 52°32′21″N 13°22′02″E

- Industry: Pharmaceutical
- Predecessor: Chemische Werke Essener Steinkohle
- Founded: 1851
- Fate: Merged
- Successor: Bayer Schering Pharma AG; Bayer HealthCare Pharmaceuticals
- Headquarters: Berlin-Wedding, Germany
- Key people: Hubertus Erlen, last CEO
- Products: Gynaecology & Andrology; Special therapeutics Diagnostical devices & Nuclear medicine Oncology
- Number of employees: 26,000 (2004)
- Website: www.schering.xyz

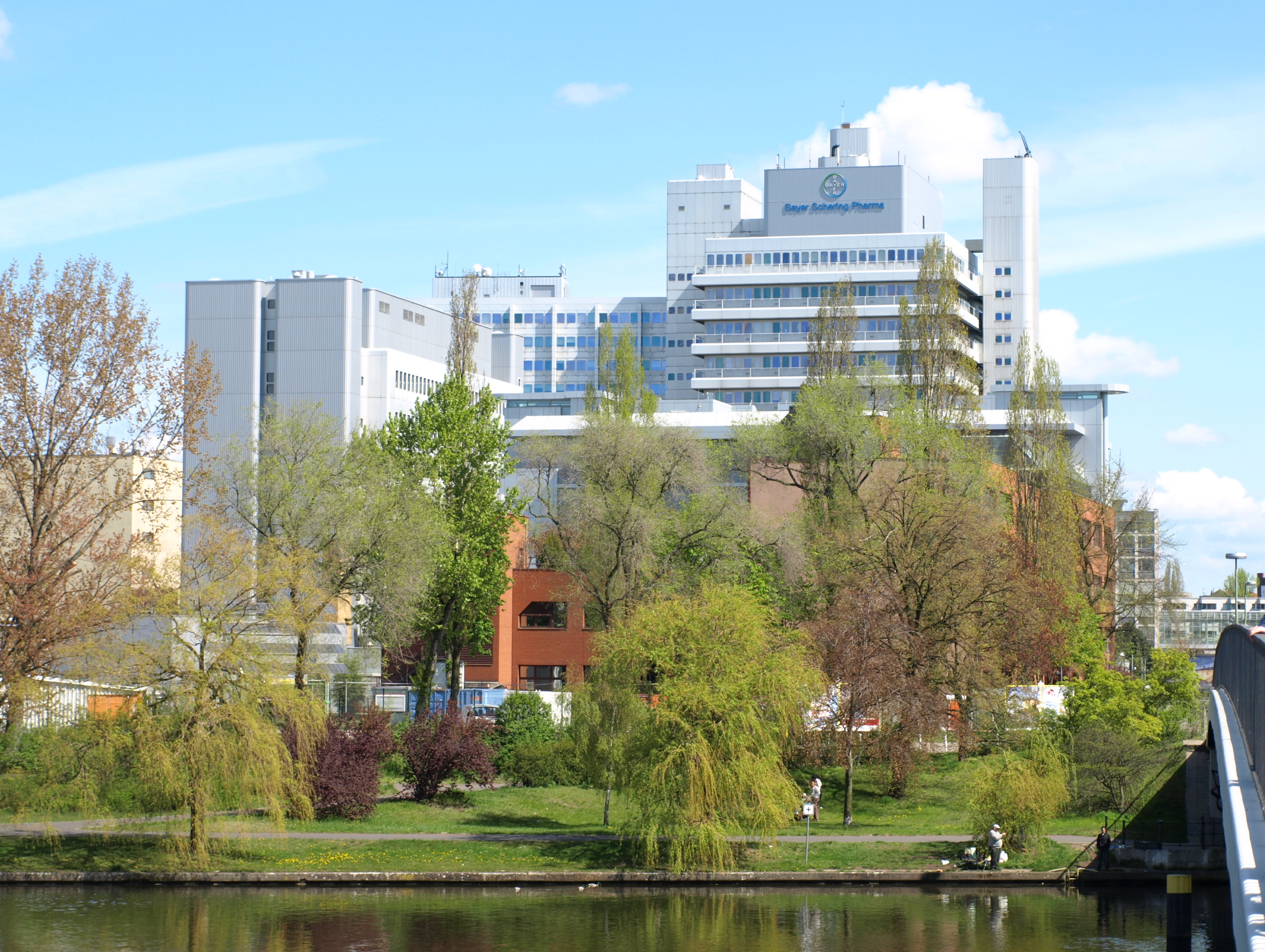
Headquarters of Schering AG, now Bayer HealthCare Pharmaceuticals, in Berlin

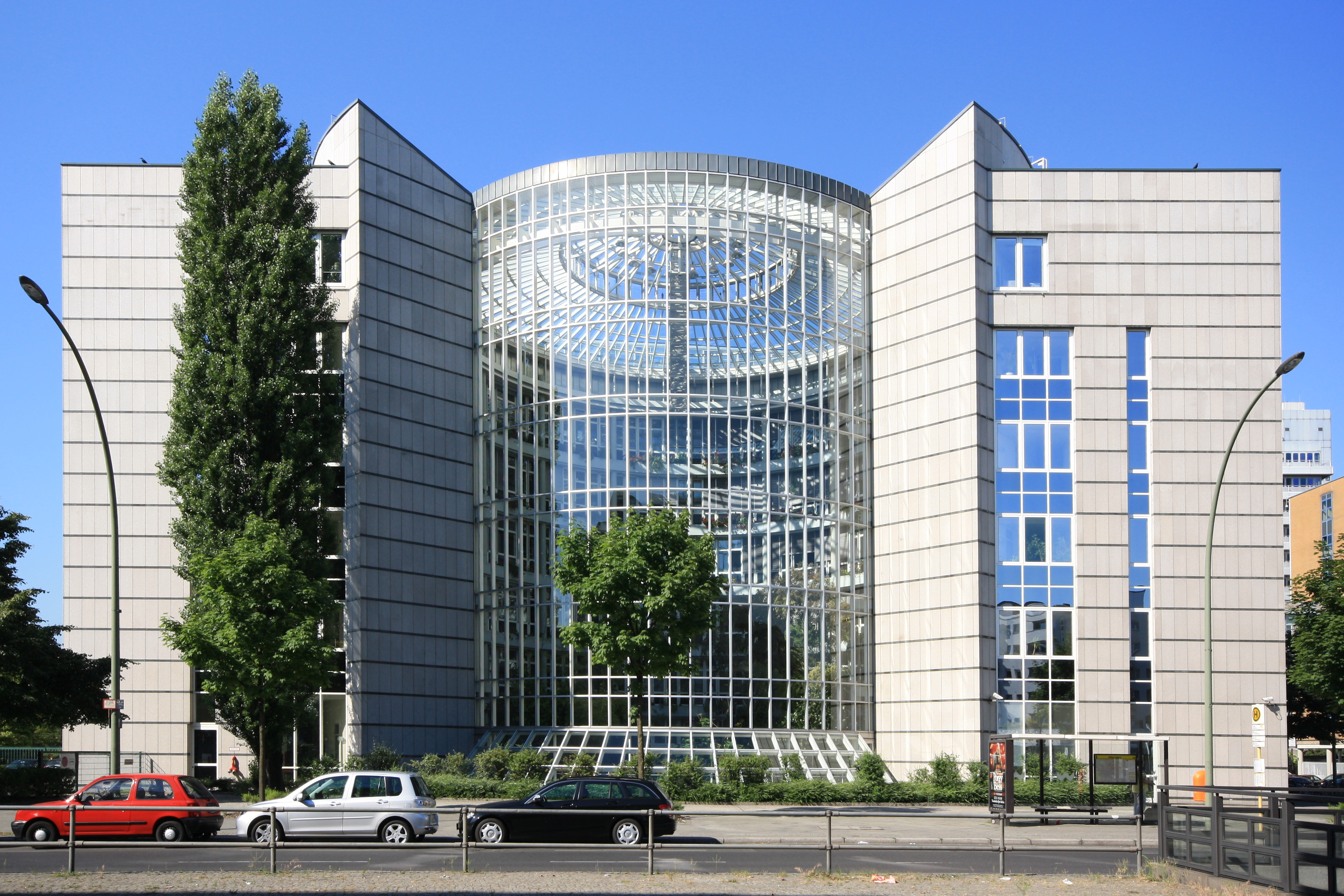
Office building for pharmacological science in Berlin

Schering AG was a research-centered German multinational pharmaceutical company headquartered in Wedding, Berlin, which operated as an independent company from 1851 to 2006. In 2006, it was bought by Bayer AG and merged to form the Bayer subsidiary Bayer Schering Pharma AG, which was renamed Bayer HealthCare Pharmaceuticals in 2011. Schering was listed on the Frankfurt Stock Exchange and had 26,000 employees as of 2004.

The American pharmaceutical company Schering-Plough, formerly the Schering Corporation, was originally the US subsidiary of Schering AG, and merged with Merck & Co. in 2009.

== History ==
In 1851, Ernst Christian Friedrich Schering opened the Grüne Apotheke (Green Pharmacy) in Berlin's Chausseestraße, and in 1871, converted into the name Chemische Fabrik auf Actien (formerly E. Schering). This date is the company's date of incorporation.

The company grew strongly in the following years. In 1913, the company employed 935 workers, 112 master craftsman and 180 office employees. In addition to the Berlin site, two factories were also located in Russia (Moscow and Wydriza (Idritsa)) with over 1,000 workers and a plant in Great Britain. Turnover at the time was about 10 million German gold mark, created with the production of photochemicals and pharmaceuticals. Important products produced were salicylic acid, the antigout preparation atophan, various sleeping and disinfecting agents.

At the beginning of the 1920s, Schering took over the wash and colouring company W. Spindler located in the Berlin district Köpenick. In 1922, the management acquired the majority of shares in the chemical factory Chemischen Fabrik auf Actien (formerly E. Schering) from the Upper Silesian Oberschlesische Kokswerke und Chemische Fabriken. By 1929, Schering had built a new production site in Berlin-Grünau, Cöpenicker Strasse, on a former storage area of the Kahlbaum chemical factory.

In 1937, the companies Kokswerke und Chemische Fabriken AG and the Chemischen Fabrik auf Actien amalgamated with the sister company Schering-Kahlbaum AG and, on the same day, renamed on account of the internationally respected name Schering to Schering Aktiengesellschaft. The pharmaceutical business thus became part of a mining and chemical group, which also produced radiographic products and pesticides.

In 1938, the Scherk company and the Scherk-Haus in Berlin were sold to Schering in the course of the "Aryanization". In July 1942, a camp for foreign forced laborers was built on the factory premises. In 1951, the factory building was repaired after being destroyed in the war.

After the end of the Second World War, the Adlershof factory of Schering AG was located in the Soviet occupation zone and thus in the later German Democratic Republic; this part became the Berlin-Chemie pharmaceutical company.

Schering was the manufacturer of Primodos.

=== Nazi medical experiments ===
In May 1999, survivors of Nazi medical experiment filed lawsuits against Bayer AG, Hoechst AG and Schering AG.

In 2003, Simon Rozenkier filed a lawsuit against Schering and Bayer concerning the horrific medical "experiments" the companies participated in during the Nazi era. "If there was ever an example of why I titled the book about my Holocaust restitution negotiations in the Clinton administration “Imperfect Justice,” Stuart Eisenstadt wrote, "it is the case of Simon Rozenkier." The lawsuit conflicted with a previous agreement under which $25 million had been set aside for victims of medical experiments, such as Rosenkier. Writing in Forward, lawyer Stuart Eizenstat wrote: "During the allocation process it became painfully evident that we simply did not have enough money to achieve anything like full justice for all of the victims".

=== Bayer takeover 2006 ===
In March 2006, Merck KGaA announced a €14.6bn bid for Schering, which by 2006 had annual gross revenue of around €5 billion and employed about 26,000 people in 140 subsidiaries worldwide. Bayer responded with a white knight bid and in July acquired the majority of shares of Schering for €14.6bn, and in 2007, Bayer took over Schering AG and formed Bayer Schering Pharma. The acquisition of Schering was the largest take-over in Bayer's history, and as of 2015 this was one of the ten biggest pharma mergers of all time.

At the time of the merger, the company employed more than 26,000 people in 140 subsidiaries worldwide. Giuseppe Vita was the Chairman of the Supervisory Board. Schering's annual gross revenue was nearly €5 billion (2003).

Schering AG focused on the business areas of gynaecology, andrology, multiple sclerosis, oncology, and contrast agents. Schering's best-known products are probably its brands of combined oral contraceptive pills. Other key products included the interferon-beta brand Betaferon (Betaseron in North America) and the paramagnetic contrast agent Magnevist.

The largest German manufacturing facility was located in Bergkamen.
