= Michael Rawlins =

British clinical pharmacologist (1941–2023)

Professor Sir Michael Rawlins GBE FBPhS FMedSci
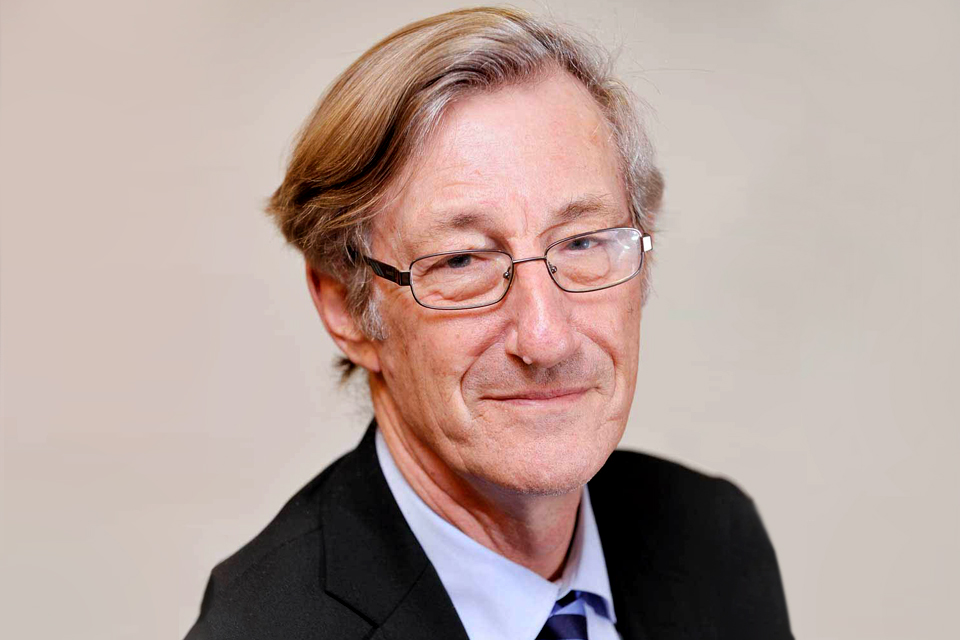
- Rawlins in 2014
- Born: 28 March 1941
- Died: 1 January 2023 (aged 81)
- Education: Uppingham School; University of London; St. Thomas' Hospital
- Medical career
- Profession: Physician
- Field: Clinical pharmacology
- Institutions: University of Newcastle upon Tyne

Chair of Committee on Safety of Medicines
- In office 1993–1998

Chair of National Institute for Health and Care Excellence
- In office 1999–2013

Chair of UK Biobank
- In office 2012 – December 2019

Chair of the Medicines and Healthcare products Regulatory Agency
- In office 1 December 2014 – September 2020

Sir Michael David Rawlins (28 March 1941 – 1 January 2023) was a British clinical pharmacologist and emeritus professor at the University of Newcastle upon Tyne. During his medical career he chaired several executive agencies including the Committee on Safety of Medicines from 1993 to 1998, followed by the National Institute for Health and Care Excellence (NICE) for 14 years from its formation in 1999 and then the Medicines and Healthcare products Regulatory Agency (MHRA) for six years from 2014. From 2012 to 2014 he was president of the Royal Society of Medicine.

Rawlins delivered several eponymous lectures during his medical career including the 2008 Harveian Oration at the Royal College of Physicians (RCP), where he argued that there were other ways of collecting useful clinical evidence other than only randomised controlled trials and he encouraged a range of methods to provide a more holistic evaluation. For his contributions to protecting people from the side-effects of medicines he was knighted in 1999, and for his services to the safety of medicines, healthcare, and innovation he was appointed Knight Grand Cross of the Order of the British Empire (GBE) in 2017.

== Early life and education ==
Michael Rawlins was born in Shrewsbury, Shropshire on 28 March 1941. His father was the Reverend Jack Rawlins, vicar of Northwood-on-Trent in Staffordshire, and his mother was Evelyn Daphne Douglas-Hamilton who following the death of his father later married a general practitioner. He attended Uppingham School, Rutland, with David Li and left there in 1959. In 1962 he graduated first class from University of London. He obtained his medical degree from St Thomas' Hospital in 1965.

== Career ==
Rawlins completed his house jobs in 1967; firstly, in surgery at St Thomas' and then in medicine at Portsmouth. His subsequent senior house job was at the Brompton Hospital, London. The following year he gained membership of the Royal College of Physicians (RCP) of London. After spending a year lecturing at St Thomas' he took up a senior register post at the Hammersmith followed by a year as visiting research fellow at the Karolinska Institute in Stockholm. In 1973, he was appointed the Ruth and Lionel Jacobson professor of clinical pharmacology at the University of Newcastle upon Tyne. There, he delivered his inaugural lecture in 1974, on "Variability in Response to Drugs", and remained at Newcastle until 2006.

From 1977 to 1983 he was a member of the National Committee on Pharmacology. In 1980 he became a member of the Committee on Safety of Medicines and was appointed its chairman in 1993; a position he retained until 1998. He was a member of the Committee on Toxicity from 1989 to 1992, and the Standing Group on Health Technology Assessment from 1993 to 1995. In 1998, he was appointed chairman of the Advisory Council on the Misuse of Drugs and served it until 2008.

Rawlins was chair of the National Institute for Clinical Excellence (NICE) from its foundation in 1999 until April 2013. There, one of his early roles was the decision not to approve wide use of Relenza for flu. Earlier he had clarified the difference of cost-effectiveness from affordability.

In 2010, he helped establish the all-party parliamentary group for Huntington's disease in the UK Parliament, supported by more than 40 MPs and peers. From 2012 to 2019 he was chair of UK Biobank. In November 2014 the Medicines and Healthcare Products Regulatory Agency (MHRA) announced the appointment of Rawlins as its new chair, succeeding Gordon Duff. The appointment was renewed for a further three years in 2017.

== Eponymous lectures ==
Rawlins delivered several eponymous lectures at the RCP, including the Bradshaw Lecture in 1986. In 1994 he gave the RCP's William Withering lecture. In it, contrary to the widely held belief that digitalis would unlikely pass modern day licensing regulations, he said of Withering's 1785 An account of the foxglove and some of its medical uses ... "Its contents would do justice to an expert report accompanying a Product Licence application to the drug regulatory authority of any state in the European Union". In 2006 he gave the RCP'S Samuel Gee Lecture.

=== De Testimonio ===
In his 2008 Harveian Lecture, titled "De Testimonio: on the evidence for decisions about the use of therapeutic interventions", while acknowledging the value of good quality trials, he argued that there were also other ways of collecting useful clinical evidence other than only randomised controlled trials (RCT) and he encouraged a range of methods to provide a more holistic evaluation. The lecture called for abandoning hierarchy of evidence at a time when Rawlins headed NICE, the UK's main independent agency whose purpose was to assess scientific evidence of medical treatments. The problem with RCTs, he stated, is that they are too generalised. He pointed out that science includes the not so exact but important "judgement". Rawlins quoted William Blake's observation .. "God forbid that truth should be confined to mathematical demonstration", and said in his lecture:

The notion that evidence can be reliably placed in hierarchies is illusory. Decision makers need to assess and appraise all the available evidence irrespective of whether it has been derived from randomized controlled trials or observational studies; and the strengths and weaknesses of each need to be understood if reasonable and reliable conclusions are to be drawn.

According to philosopher John Worrall, if other physicians in the field of evidence based medicine held similar views to Rawlins, his [Worrall's] own philosophical work on evidence based medicine might not be required.

== Honours and awards ==
Rawlins became a Fellow of the RCP London in 1977, and 10 years later became Fellow of the Royal College of Physicians of Edinburgh. He gained Fellowship of the Faculty of Pharmaceutical Medicine in 1989 and of the Academy of Medical Sciences in 1998.

He was awarded the Hutchinson Medal in 2003, and the Galen Medal in 2010. In 2012 he received the Prince Mahidol Award for his contribution to medicine. Zenith Global Health awarded him their Lifetime Achievement Award in 2019.

Rawlins was knighted in the 1999 New Year Honours for services to the improvement of patient protection from the side-effects of medicines, and was appointed Knight Grand Cross of the Order of the British Empire (GBE) in the 2017 Birthday Honours for services to the safety of medicines, healthcare, and innovation.

== Personal and family ==
In 1963 he married Elizabeth Hambly, a nurse; they divorced in 2005. In 1981 he became the first chairman of the Newcastle upon Tyne SDP and played an active part in the founding and development of the new party.

== Death ==
Rawlins died in Darlington from sepsis and heart failure on 1 January 2023, at the age of 81. At the time of his death he was honorary professor at the London School of Hygiene & Tropical Medicine, University of London, and emeritus professor at the University of Newcastle upon Tyne. Rawlins is survived by his daughters Vicky, Lucy, and Suzannah, and eight grandchildren.

== Selected publications ==
=== Articles ===
- Rawlins, MD (12 October 1974). "Variability in Response to Drugs". British Medical Journal. 4 (5936): 91–94. doi:10.1136/bmj.4.5936.91. PMC 1612144. PMID 4607336.
- Rawlins, MD. (June 1986). "Spontaneous reporting of adverse drug reactions". The Quarterly Journal of Medicine. 59 (230): 531–534. ISSN 0033-5622. PMID 3749447.
- Rawlins, MD (January 1995). "Pharmacovigilance: paradise lost, regained or postponed? The William Withering Lecture 1994". Journal of the Royal College of Physicians of London. 29 (1): 41–9. doi:10.1016/S0035-8819(25)00659-2. PMC 5401160. PMID 7738878.
- Rawlins, MD (December 2008). "De Testimonio: on the evidence for decisions about the use of therapeutic interventions". Clinical Medicine. 8 (6): 579–588. doi:10.7861/clinmedicine.8-6-579. ISSN 1470-2118. PMC 4954394. PMID 19149278.

=== Books ===
- Smith, Stephen Edward; Rawlins, Michael David (1976). Variability in Human Drug Response. Butterworths. ISBN 978-0-407-43301-4.
- Delivering Quality in the NHS 2005. Radcliffe Publishing. 2005. ISBN 978-1-85775-742-2.
- Therapeutics, Evidence and Decision-Making. CRC Press. 2011. ISBN 978-1-85315-947-3.
