= University of Portsmouth =

Public university in Portsmouth, England

- Coat of arms of the University of Portsmouth
- Other names: UoP; Portsmouth University
- Former name: See § History
- Motto: Latin: Lucem Sequamur
- Motto in English: Let us follow the Light
- Type: Public
- Established: c. 1870; 156 years ago (as Portsmouth and Gosport School of Science and Art)
- Academic affiliations: Universities UK; Defence Universities Alliance
- Budget: £290.5 million (2021/22)
- Chancellor: Karen Blackett
- Vice-Chancellor: Graham Galbraith
- Total staff: 3,500
- Students: 29,000 (2021/2022)
- Undergraduates: 22,170 (2020/21)
- Postgraduates: 6,110 (2020/21)
- Location: Portsmouth, Hampshire, United Kingdom; 50°47′43″N 01°05′36″W
- Campus: Multiple sites including: University Quarter Northern Quarter Langstone Campus London Campus
- Colours: Purple; Black; White
- Website: port.ac.uk
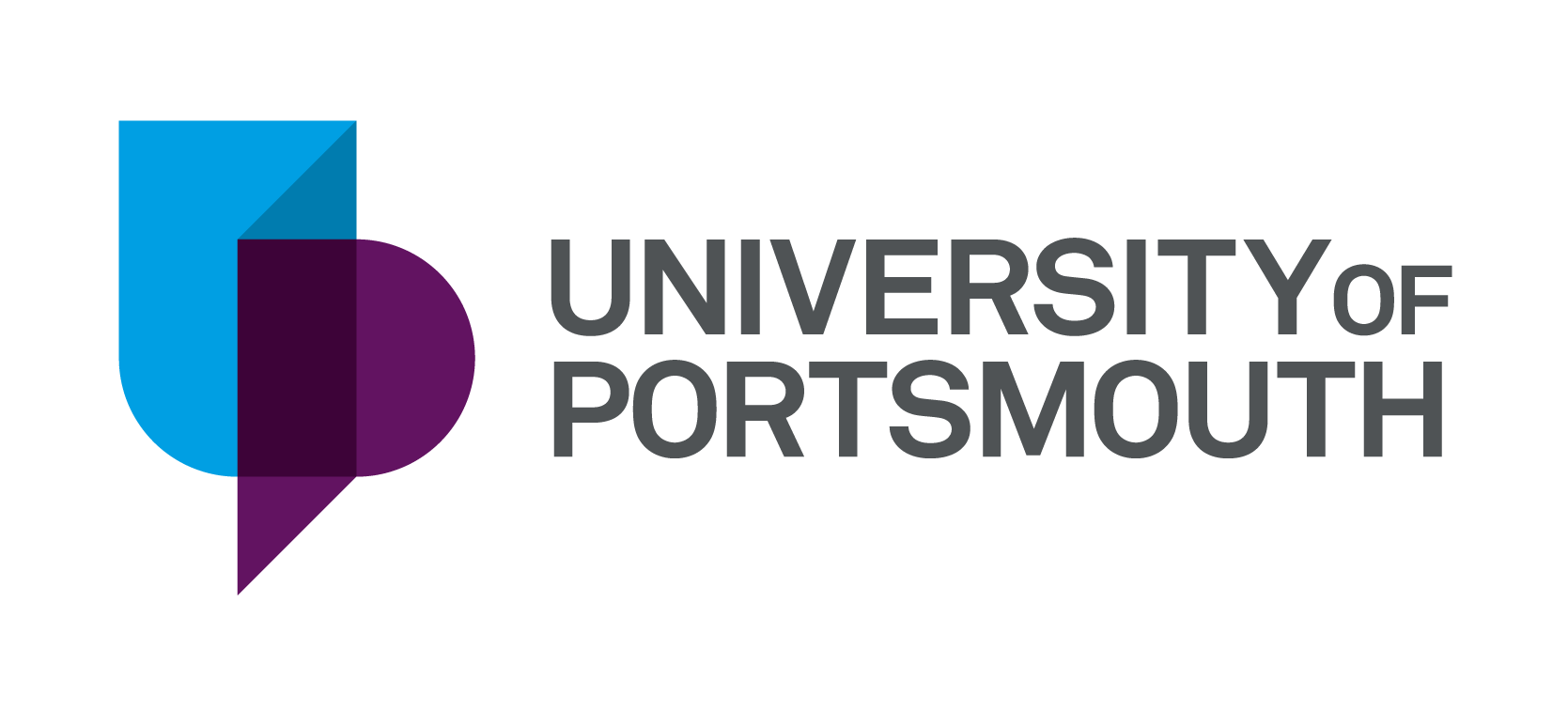

- Location in Hampshire

The University of Portsmouth (UoP) is a public university in Portsmouth, England. Its institutional origins trace back to 1870 with the establishment of the Portsmouth and Gosport School of Science and Art. Over the subsequent decades, the institution underwent a series of organisational transformations, becoming Portsmouth Polytechnic in 1969 before gaining university status in 1992. Comprising five faculties, the university offers a wide range of academic disciplines. In 2022, with around 28,280 students enrolled in undergraduate and postgraduate programs, the university was the 25th-largest higher education institution by student enrolments in the United Kingdom. The university employed approximately 3,500 staff in 2020.

Portsmouth is one of five universities in the South East of England to have been awarded the highest rating of Gold in the 2023 Teaching Excellence Framework. In the Times Higher Education REF ranking, the university was ranked third in research power for modern post-1992 universities.

77% of research submitted by the university to REF 2021 was rated in the highest categories - world-leading and internationally excellent - with wide-ranging impacts on society, health, culture, and the environment.

The university is ranked third of all modern post-92 universities in the UK for research power, which measures the quality and quantity of research submitted into the exercise.

Portsmouth's REF 2021 submission included 1,407 research outputs and 54 impact case studies across 16 subject disciplines and involved 603 academic staff.

Ceremonially, the university is headed by a Chancellor, currently Karen Blackett, a British Barbadian businesswoman known for her work in the advertising industry.

== History ==
=== 19th century ===
The University of Portsmouth traces its roots back to 1 June 1870 (or 1869 according to some sources) when it was first established as the Portsmouth and Gosport School of Science and Art. During the late 19th century, the school occupied several buildings in Old Portsmouth and Southsea. The main premises, located at the Crown Sale Rooms in Pembroke Street, was attended by both male and female students. Due to its coastal location, the school provided technical instruction to engineers and skilled workers, who often graduated to work at the city docks, including for the Royal Navy at the Portsmouth Royal Dockyard. The curriculum comprised a range of skills including practical geometry, artistic anatomy, and architectural and mechanical drawing. Additionally, the school provided evening classes for local artisans.

==== Portsmouth Municipal Technical Institute and the College of Art ====
In 1894, following education reforms which vested local authorities with control over technical and manual education, the Borough of Portsmouth established the Portsmouth Municipal Technical Institute. Having acquired the school's science and technology courses, the Portsmouth and Gosport School of Science and Art (1869-1907) was restructured to become the College of Art.

The College of Art merged with the University of Portsmouth on 1 August 1994, and became the Portsmouth School of Art, Design and Media.

The College of Art (1894-1994) previous names were:

- The Municipal School of Art, 1908-1936
- Southern College of Art Portsmouth Centre, 1937-1952
- City of Portsmouth College of Art, 1953-1964
- City of Portsmouth College of Art and Design, 1965-1977
- City of Portsmouth College of Art, Design and Further Education, 1977-1994

=== 20th century ===
In 1903, following the enactment of the Education Act 1902, construction began on a site behind the Portsmouth Guildhall. Designed by local architect G.E. Smith and completed in 1908, the building incorporates a combination of Flemish and Renaissance architectural styles. In the same year, the Portsmouth Municipal Technical Institute was succeeded by the newly established Portsmouth Municipal College. Providing a range of further and higher education courses in chemistry and engineering, the college occupied the building together with the College of Art, the Portsmouth Day Training College, and a public reference library. Today, the grade II listed building remains in use by the university and has since become known as the Park Building, having been named after an adjacent urban park known as Victoria Park.

In 1911, male and female Students' union were established. In autumn of 1911, the first addition of student magazine The Galleon, reported the creation of a women's basketball team and expressed discontent over the state of the common room.

Following World War II, there was a decline in the need for engineering skills in Britain. In response, the college diversified its curriculum to include the arts and humanities.

In 1953, the Portsmouth Municipal College, having changed its name to the Portsmouth College of Technology, became the Regional College for Southern England.

The college was renamed Portsmouth Polytechnic after it gained polytechnic status in 1969 and by the late 1980s was one of the largest polytechnics in the UK.

On 7 July 1992 the inauguration of the University of Portsmouth was celebrated at a ceremony at Portsmouth Guildhall. As a new university, it could validate its own degrees, under the provision of the Further and Higher Education Act 1992.

=== 21st century ===
On Friday 4 May 2018, the University of Portsmouth was revealed as the main shirt sponsor of Portsmouth F.C. for the 2018–19, 2019–20 and 2020–21 seasons.

== Campuses ==
The University of Portsmouth campus is spread across Portsmouth city centre, including the Guildhall Campus and the nearby Northern Quarter. There are also sports facilities and halls of residence at Langstone in Milton, on the eastern edge of Portsea Island, as well as a recently established London Campus.

Guildhall Campus

Located in the city centre, Guildhall Campus includes most of the University's teaching buildings and student accommodation, alongside key facilities such as the University Library, Students' Union, and Ravelin Sports Centre. The campus blends historic and modern architecture, with highlights including the Park Building, the University's original site, and the White Swan Building, a contemporary performing arts centre linked to the New Theatre Royal. Other major buildings include St Michael's Building (pharmacy and biomedical sciences) and King Henry Building (psychology and biological sciences). The nearby Ravelin Park offers green space for events and relaxation, while Guildhall Square hosts graduation ceremonies.

The University Library (formerly the Frewen Library) was extended in 2006 at a cost of £11 million.

Northern Quarter

The Northern Quarter lies just north of the railway line and is home to key academic departments for engineering, science, business, law, and the humanities. Notable buildings include the Anglesea Building (engineering and law), Richmond Building (Portsmouth Business School), and the Dennis Sciama Building, home to the Institute of Cosmology and Gravitation and student café The Hub. The Milldam Building houses humanities in a former military barracks, while Burnaby, Buckingham, Lion Gate, and the Future Technology Centre support disciplines including computing, earth sciences, and civil engineering. The sustainable Portland Building hosts surveying and property development programmes.

Langstone

The Langstone Campus is located on the edge of Langstone Harbour and hosts the Langstone Sports Site. The site also includes Langstone Halls, quieter coastal accommodation ideal for students involved in sport.

Langstone Campus used to be home of the university's School of Languages and Area Studies, which has since moved into Park Building in the University Quarter. It also used to be home to three halls of residence: Queen Elizabeth Queen Mother (QEQM), Trust Hall and Langstone Flats.

London Campus

In September 2023, the University opened its London Campus in Walthamstow. Offering a block-teaching model with fixed timetables and integrated assessments, the campus aims to support local economic growth and job creation.

Future Campus Investment

The University is investing £250 million into its city-centre campus to create world-class facilities for teaching, research, and innovation. Recent developments include the award-winning Ravelin Sports Centre, with a Student Hub and Technology Building in development.

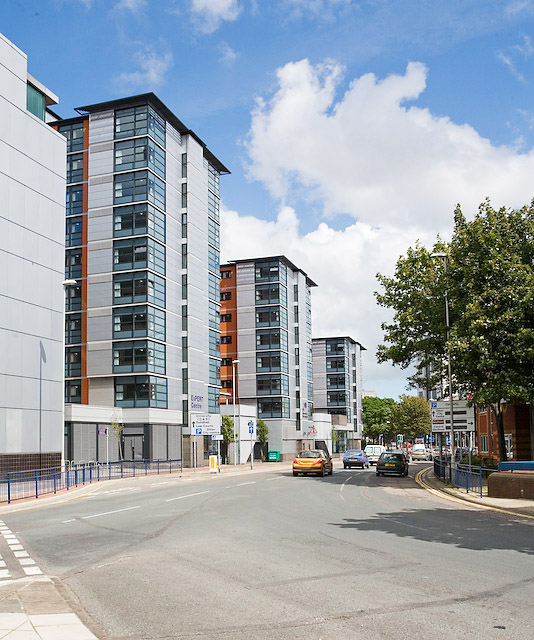
James Watson Building

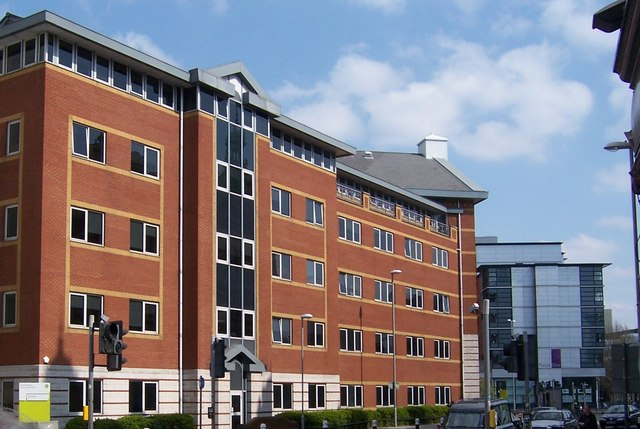
St Andrew's Court

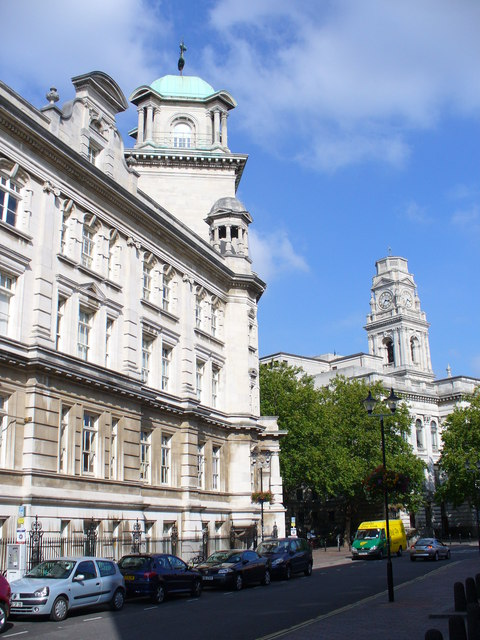
Park Building

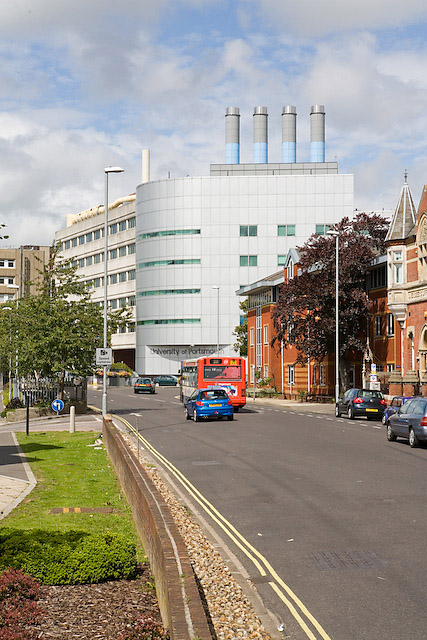
St Michael's Building

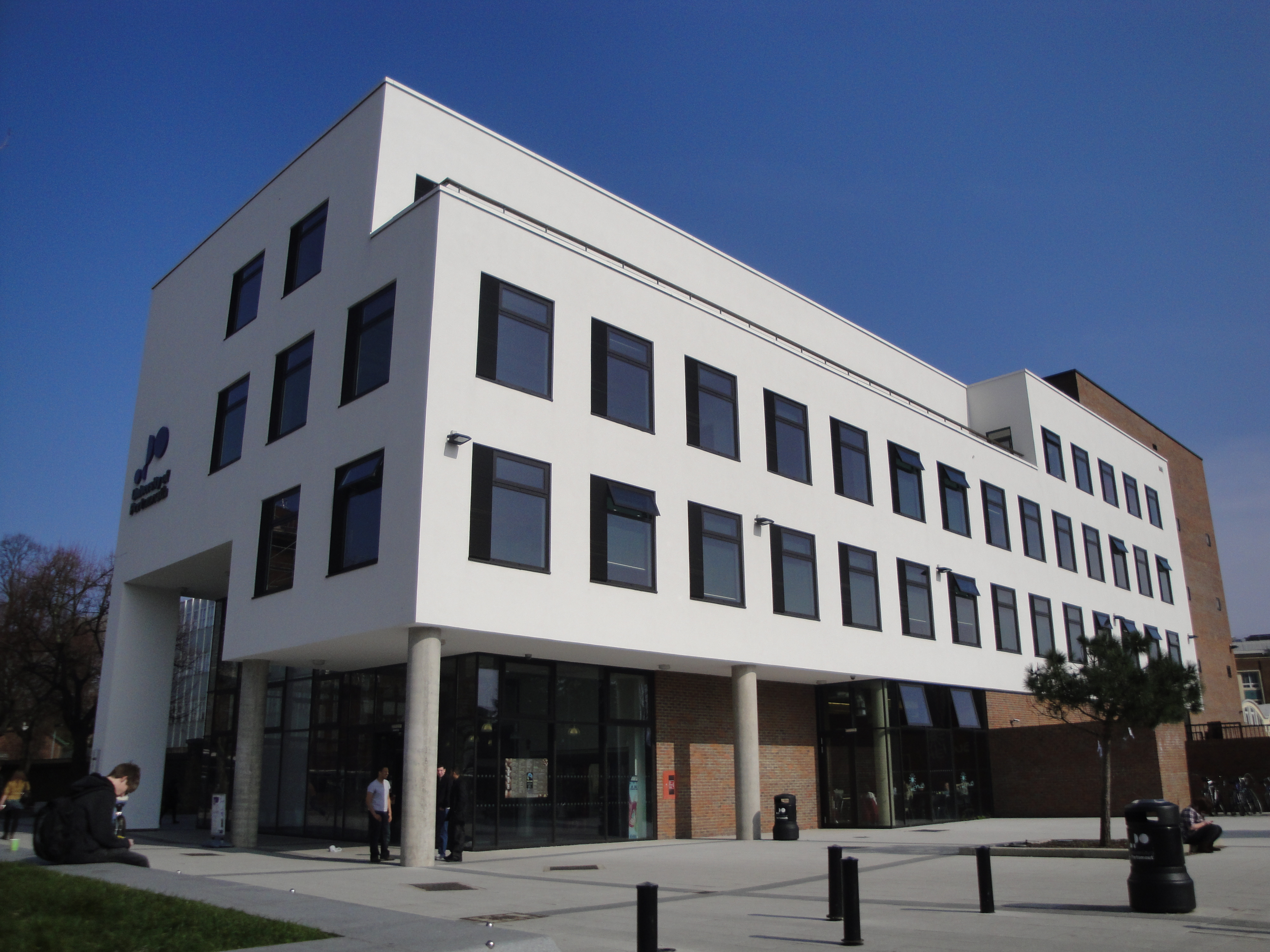
Dennis Sciama Building

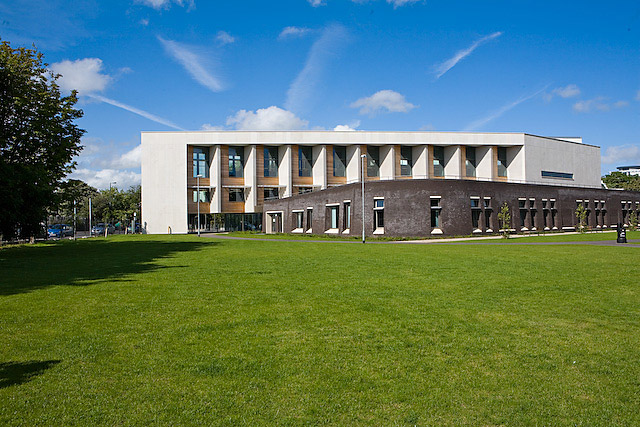
University Library

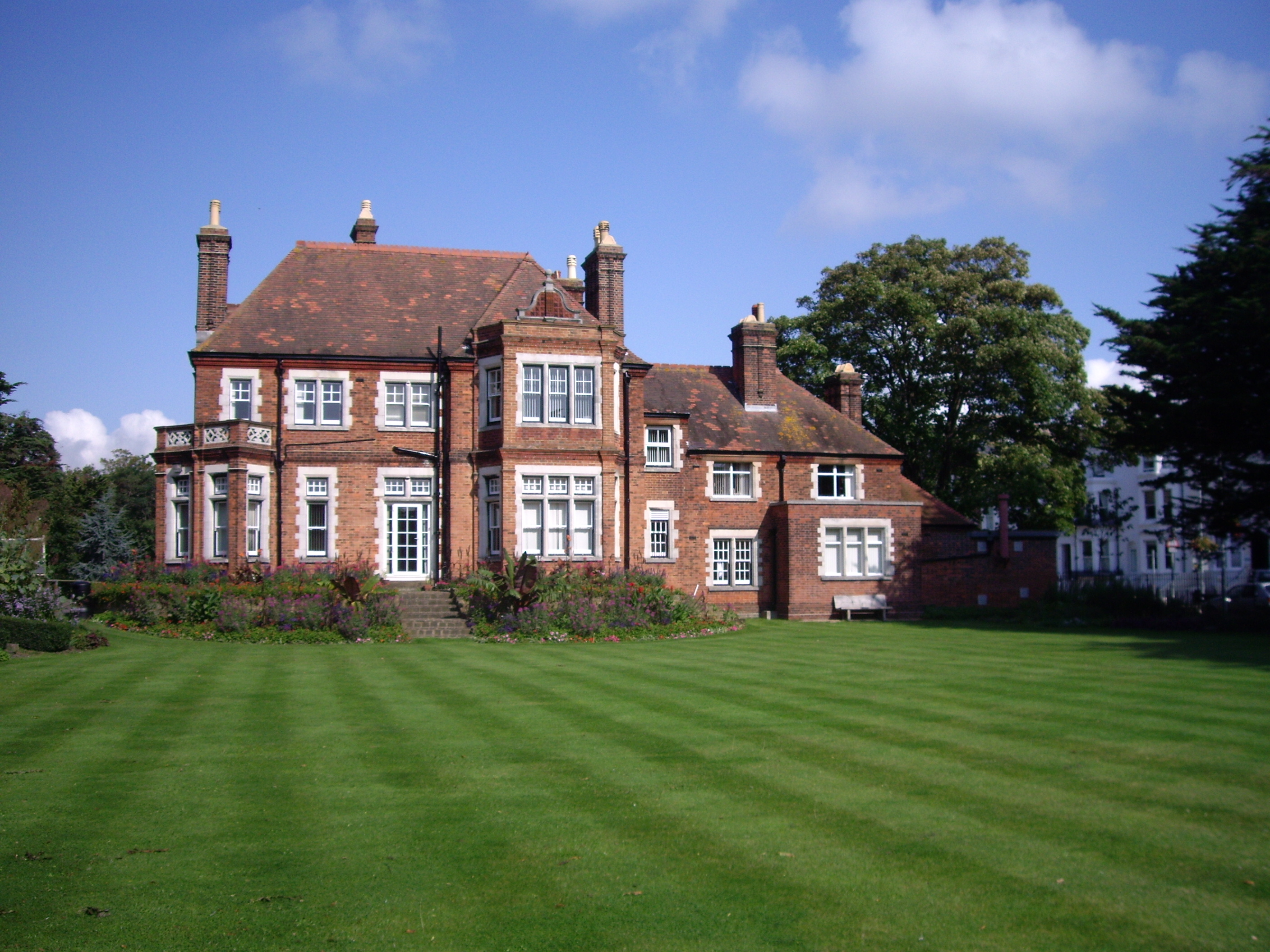
Ravelin House

== Organisation and structure ==
=== Governance ===
The university is ceremonially headed by Karen Blackett, who was installed as chancellor in 2017. The university is, however, run day-to-day by the vice-chancellor, presently Professor Graham Galbraith, along with a single integrated decision-making body known as the university executive board. This includes deputy vice-chancellors, the provost, the chief financial officer and the executive deans of faculties, together with the chief people officer and the executive director of corporate governance.

The university's board of governors is the university's governing body and is ultimately responsible for the university and all of its activities.

=== Faculties ===
The University of Portsmouth is composed of five faculties divided into a number of schools, institutes, academies and departments. As of September 2026, these are:

Faculty of Business and Law

- School of Accounting, Economics and Finance
- School of Law
- School of Organisations, Systems and People
- School of Strategy, Marketing and Innovation

Faculty of Creative and Cultural Industries

- School of Architecture, Art and Design
- School of Film, Media, and Creative Technologies

Faculty of Humanities and Social Sciences

- School of Criminology and Criminal Justice
- School of Area Studies, Sociology, History, Politics and Literature
- School of Education, Languages and Linguistics

Faculty of Science and Health

- School of the Environment and Life Sciences
- School of Dental, Health and Care Professions
- School of Medicine, Pharmacy and Biomedical Sciences
- School of Psychology, Sport and Health Sciences
- Medical Degree

Faculty of Technology

- School of Civil Engineering and Surveying
- School of Computing, Mathematics and Physics
- School of Electrical and Mechanical Engineering
- Institute of Cosmology and Gravitation

=== Finances ===
According to an independent assessment in 2017, the University of Portsmouth is worth £1.1 billion to the British economy and brings £476 million to the city.

== Academic profile ==
Portsmouth offers more than 200 undergraduate degrees and 150 postgraduate degrees, as well as 65 research degree programs.

=== Research ===
Over 60% of research submitted by the university to REF2014 was rated as world-leading and internationally excellent. In two subject areas respectively – Allied Health Professions, Dentistry, Nursing and Pharmacy, and Physics – 90% and 89% of all research submitted was rated as world leading and internationally excellent.

The university received the highest overall rating of Gold in the most recent Teaching Excellence Framework in 2021, one of only 27 Gold rated universities in England and one of five Gold rated universities in the South East.

=== Rankings ===
Rankings
National rankings
- Complete (2027): 50=
- Guardian (2027): 36
- Times / Sunday Times (2027): 61

Global rankings
- ARWU (2026): 901–1000
- QS (2027): 662=
- THE (2026): 401–500

Portsmouth was rated in the top 401–500 universities in the world by the Times Higher Education World University Rankings for 2025, #635 by QS World University Rankings for 2026, #901-1,000 by Academic Ranking of World Universities for 2024, #558 by U.S. News & World Report for 2025-2026, and #847 by CWUR rankings for 2025.

Internationally, the university was ranked 98th in Times Higher Education's '100 under 50' rankings of international modern universities 2017, but did not make the list in any subsequent year.

The University of Portsmouth was one of four universities in 2017 in the south east to achieve the highest Gold rating in the Teaching Excellence Framework (TEF).

=== UCAS Clearing ===
The University of Portsmouth participates in the UCAS Clearing process, supporting students to find the right course. The university offers a UCAS Points calculator that prospective students can use to see what grades are needed to get into a course at Portsmouth.

== Student life ==
Students' Union

The University of Portsmouth Students' Union (UPSU) is a registered charity that represents and supports all UoP students, who automatically become members upon registering for their course. The Students' Union offers members support services, development opportunities and represent them at different levels throughout the university, in the community and beyond.

The Union Advice Service offers confidential, impartial and non-judgemental support on a range of academic and university issues. The service also undertakes other activities and events throughout the year to promote the health and wellbeing of students. The Advice Service is based in Gun House at The Union, next door to The Terrace Cafe. Portsmouth was named one of the UK's most affordable city for students in the Natwest Student Living Index 2024.

=== Societies ===
The Student's Union supports a range of over 152 student-led groups that provide extra-curricular opportunities to students, including societies and volunteering opportunities. Students can also create new societies with the support of the Union.

=== Sports clubs ===
The university offers a range of sports clubs which are administered by the University's Sport and Recreation Department The sports range from traditional team games like athletics, football, cricket, rugby, netball, hockey, and table tennis to volleyball, lacrosse, sailing and ultimate frisbee. As of October 2025 there are 34 different sports clubs .

== Notable people ==
=== Faculty ===
- Deborah Sugg Ryan, Professor of Design History and Theory
- Jen Gupta, Astrophysicist and science communicator
- Nizar Ibrahim, professor of palaeontology
- Claudia Maraston, professor of astrophysics and winner of the 2018 Eddington Medal
- Alessandro Melis, professor of architecture innovation and curator of the Italian Pavilione at the XVII Venice Biennale
- June Purvis, professor of women's and gender history
- Neil Rackham, visiting professor at Portsmouth Business School and award-winning author
- David Wands, professor of cosmology at the Institute of Cosmology and Gravitation

=== Alumni ===
Notable students of the University of Portsmouth and its predecessor institutions include:

- Mohammed Abubakar Adamu, former head of the Police of Nigeria
- Karen Blackett, Chancellor of The University of Portsmouth
- Paola Arlotta, chair of the Regenerative Biology Department at Harvard University
- Simon Armitage, poet, playwright and novelist who was appointed poet laureate in 2019
- John Armitt, civil engineer and chairman of the Olympic Delivery Authority
- Ian Bishop, archdeacon of Macclesfield
- Jonathan Bullock, former member of the European Parliament for the East Midlands constituency
- Nira Chamberlain, principal consultant at SNC-Lavalin and president of the Institute of Mathematics and its Applications
- David Chidgey, Baron Chidgey, Liberal Democrat politician and former member of Parliament for Eastleigh
- Ron Davies, former secretary of state for Wales and member of Parliament for Caerphilly
- Chuck Easttom, computer scientist, author, and inventor
- John Flint, British banker and former chief executive officer of HSBC
- James Farrar, actor
- Ben Fogle, broadcaster, writer and adventurer
- Christine Foyer, professor of plant science at Birmingham University
- Tim Godwin, former police officer who served as deputy commissioner of Deputy Commissioner of Police of the Metropolis
- Casyo 'Krept' Johnson, London-based musician and half of Krept and Konan
- Craig Jones, Royal Navy officer and campaigner
- Nick Kennedy, retired rugby union player and former director of rugby at London Irish
- Rachel Lowe, businesswoman and developer of the Destination board games
- Diana Maddock, Baroness Maddock, former president of the Liberal Democrats and member of Parliament for Christchurch
- Ehsan Masood, science writer, journalist, broadcaster, and lecturer at Imperial College London
- Andrew Miller, former member of Parliament for Ellesmere Port and Neston
- Gerard Collier, 5th Baron Monkswell, politician and hereditary peer
- Darren Naish, vertebrate palaeontologist, author, science communicator, and scientific advisor to Netflix
- Tim Peake, Army Air Corps officer, European Space Agency astronaut, and former International Space Station crew member
- Grayson Perry, contemporary artist, writer, broadcaster, and recipient of the Turner Prize
- John Rees, national officer of the Stop the War Coalition and visiting research fellow at Goldsmiths, University of London
- Vernon Ross, Archdeacon of Westmorland and Furness
- Carol Smart, feminist sociologist and academic at Manchester University
- Lauren Steadman, Paralympic athlete who competed in three summer Paralympics in both swimming and the paratriathlon
- Anthony Tucker-Jones, former defence intelligence officer and a widely published military expert
- Kat Watkins, disability rights activist
- Martin Whitmarsh, businessman and chief executive of McLaren Racing

== See also ==
- Armorial of UK universities
- Drug Safety Research Unit
- International College Portsmouth
- Isle of Wight College
- List of universities in the UK
- Post-1992 universities
