= Order of Merit of Berlin =

Decoration of Merit
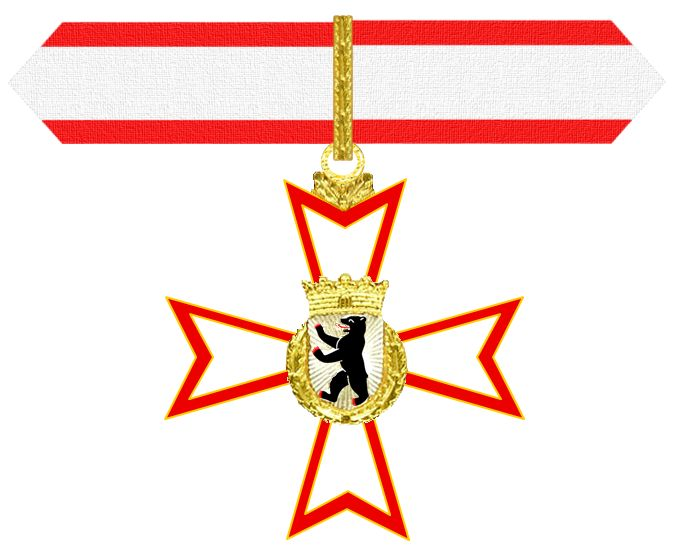

Awarded by the Senate of Berlin
- Type: Civil order of merit
- Established: 21 July 1987
- Country: Germany
- Awarded for: Outstanding contributions to the state of Berlin
- Grand Master: Michael Müller
- Grades: Member

Statistics
- Total inductees: 431
- Ribbon bar of the order

The Order of Merit of Berlin (German: Verdienstorden des Landes Berlin) is this highest award of the German State of Berlin. Awarded in the name of the Senate of Berlin, the order had recognized outstanding contributions to the State of Berlin since 21 July 1987. Awarded each year on 1 October, the anniversary of the Berlin Constitution, the order is limited to no more than 400 living recipients. As of 2016 the order had been awarded 431 times, to 152 women and 279 men.

== Design of the order ==
The Order of Merit of Berlin is awarded in a single class. The badge of the order is a white enamel Maltese cross edged in red. In the center of the cross is a depiction of the golden crowned Coat of arms of Berlin surrounded by a gold wreath. It is worn around the neck on a white ribbon with red edges.

== Notable recipients ==
- Franziska van Almsick
- Stefan Arndt
- Vladimir Ashkenazy
- Seyran Ateş
- Hani Azer
- Marianne Birthler
- Eberhard Diepgen
- Paul van Dyk
- Rudi Fehr
- Klaus and Eva Herlitz
- Inge Keller
- Don Jackson
- Lena Schöneborn
- Milan Popadić
- Judy Winter
- Jenny Wolf
- Walter H. Yates, Jr.
- Heinz Dürr
- Giuseppe Vita

== See also ==
- List of Holders of the Order of Merit of Berlin (German Wikipedia)
