= Giuseppe Vita =

Italian corporate executive (born 1935)

- Born: April 28, 1935 (age 90); Favara, Sicily, Italy
- Occupation: Corporate executive
- Known for: Chairman of Schering AG, Axel Springer SE, UniCredit
- Children: 2
- Awards: Cavaliere del Lavoro (1990); Order of Merit of the State of Berlin (1994); German Business Hall of Fame (2003)

Giuseppe Vita (born 28 April 1935) is an Italian corporate executive, notable for his leadership roles in pharmaceutical, media, and banking sectors across Germany and Italy. Trained as a radiologist, he became a prominent figure in several European companies, including Schering AG, Axel Springer SE, and UniCredit.

== Early life and education ==
Vita was born in Favara, Sicily, and raised on a family estate with fourteen siblings. He earned his high school diploma in 1953, studied medicine at the Universities of Catania and Rome, and graduated in 1959 summa cum laude. Specializing in radiology in 1961, he received a stipend to attend the Radiology Institute of the Johannes Gutenberg University in Mainz, Germany, in 1962–63.

== Career ==
=== Schering AG ===
In 1964, Vita joined Schering AG in Berlin as a research associate in contrast media development and later moved into management. He returned to Italy as CEO of Schering SpA in Milan, building a successful subsidiary. In 1987, he rejoined the Berlin headquarters and was appointed to the board. In June 1989, he became Chairman of the Executive Board (CEO). In 2001, he transitioned to Chairman of the Supervisory Board, a position he held until 2006.

=== Axel Springer SE ===
Vita joined the Supervisory Board of Axel Springer AG in 2001 and became Chairman in 2002, serving until 2019. In 2018, the company announced his succession by Ralph Büchi following the 2019 Annual General Meeting. He stepped down in April 2019 after 17 years as chairman.

=== UniCredit ===
In May 2012, Vita was appointed Chairman of the Board of Directors of UniCredit, a major pan-European bank, a role he held until April 2018. At his final shareholders' meeting in 2018, he reflected on leading UniCredit through a period of transformation and the launch of its "Transform 2019" plan. He had previously been chairman of Allianz S.p.A. (until May 2012), resigning that role upon assuming the UniCredit chairmanship.

=== Other positions ===
Vita held leadership or board roles across numerous companies, including:

- Chairman of the Supervisory Board of Hugo Boss (2000–2008)
- Chairman of Deutz AG (2006–2009)
- Supervisory boards: Allianz Lebensversicherungs-AG, Continental AG, Evonik Degussa, Vattenfall Europe AG, and Bewag (Berlin)

In Italy, he served as Chairman or board member of Allianz S.p.A., Banca Leonardo Group, Deutsche Bank Italia, and as board member of Barilla, Humanitas, Pirelli, and RCS MediaGroup.

He has also held roles in non-corporate organizations, including the Aspen Institute Italia, the Italian group of the Trilateral Commission, the Istituto per gli Studi di Politica Internazionale (ISPI), the European Financial Services Round Table, the Robert Koch Foundation, and the Accademia Teatro alla Scala, where he became honorary chairman in 2024.

== Honours and recognition ==
- Cavaliere del Lavoro (Order of Merit for Labour), Italy, 1990
- Order of Merit of the State of Berlin, 1994
- Inducted into the German Business Hall of Fame, 2003

== Personal life ==
Vita is married and has two children. He maintains residences in Berlin–Tiergarten and Milan.
