= International College Portsmouth =

- Type: Private
- Established: 2009
- Parent institution: University of Portsmouth
- Location: Portsmouth, UK
- Website: www.port.ac.uk/icp

International College Portsmouth (or ICP) is the on-campus college of the University of Portsmouth in Portsmouth, UK. It is a member of Navitas.

The college offers undergraduate and postgraduate programs for international students (and EU students for postgraduate pathways) in subjects including Business, Accounting & Finance, Law, Engineering, Science, Mathematics, Creative Technologies and Computing.

== Campus ==
ICP is situated in the heart of the University of Portsmouth city centre campus, University Quarter. ICP is reached by train (Portsmouth & Southsea Station) and is 20 minutes away from Southampton Airport.

== Pathways ==
ICP students can begin their undergraduate program with English Language, Stage 1 (University Foundation) or Stage 2 (First Year Degree). Students can begin their postgraduate program with English Language or Stage 1 (Pre-Master's). All programs lead to a degree from the University of Portsmouth.

Undergraduate programs

- Accounting and Finance
- Architecture, Design and Fashion
- Business and Management
- Computing
- Humanities and Social Sciences
- Media and Games Technologies
- Engineering
- Law
- Mathematics
- Property and Surveying
- Science

Postgraduate programs

- Architecture, Art and Design
- Business and Management
- Education
- Finance
- International Relations and Criminal Justice
- Logistics and Supply Chain Management
- Science and Engineering
