= Stuart Ralston =

Academic physician

Stuart H Ralston is an academic physician based at the University of Edinburgh, where he is affiliated with the Centre for Genomic and Experimental Medicine. He has written extensively on the molecular and genetic basis of osteoporosis, Paget's disease of bone and other bone and joint diseases.

== Current status ==
In addition to his Professorship, Ralston is a rheumatologist with NHS Lothian, where he is the clinical lead for the osteoporosis service and the clinical director of the rheumatology service.

Ralston serves as joint editor-in-chief of Calcified Tissue International and editor of Davidson's Principles and Practice of Medicine. He was chair of the Commission on Human Medicines for the Medicines and Healthcare products Regulatory Agency of the UK between 2013 and 2021. He is currently chair of the board of trustees of the Paget's Association a UK charity that funds research, raises awareness and provides support for those affected by Paget's disease of bone.

== Fellowships ==
- 2015, Honorary Fellow of the Faculty of Pharmaceutical Medicine, FFPM
- 2005, Fellow of the Royal Society of Edinburgh, FRSE
- 1999, Fellow of the Academy of Medical Sciences, FMedSci
- 1994, Fellow of the Royal College of Physicians Edinburgh, FRCP (Edin)
- 1980, Member of the Royal College of Physicians, MRCP
