= Drug Safety Research Unit =

- Established: 1981
- Type: Nonprofit
- Location: Southampton, England
- Director: Linda Härmark
- Parent organization: University of Portsmouth
- Website: www.dsru.org

Drug Safety Research Unit (DSRU) is an independent, non-profit organisation in the United Kingdom, in the field of pharmacology. It is an associate college of the University of Portsmouth, offering postgraduate qualifications in pharmacovigilance.

The unit is based in Southampton, and was established in 1981 by Bill Inman and David Finney. Its director since April 2025 is Dr. Linda Härmark.

It is operated by the Drug Safety Research Trust, a charitable organization registered in England and Wales.
