= Rachel Lowe (artist) =

British artist and filmmaker

- Born: 1968 (age 57–58)
- Education: Camberwell College of Arts; Chelsea School of Arts

Rachel Lowe (born 1968) is a British artist and filmmaker.

== Early life and education ==
Lowe was born in Newcastle upon Tyne. She studied at the Camberwell College of Arts from 1987 to 1990 and at the Chelsea School of Art from 1992 to 1993.

== Career ==
Her work is included in the collections of the Tate Museum, London and the British Council.
