= Bill Inman =

William Howard Wallace Inman, MRCP, FRCP, FFPHM (1 August 1929 – 20 October 2005), also known as WHW Inman, was a British doctor and pioneer of methods and systems to detect risks of treatment with drugs. As well as holding positions in health institutions in the UK, he was active in international efforts to co-ordinate drug safety monitoring.

== Life and career ==
Inman was born at Banstead, Surrey in 1929, the son of a businessman. He attended Ampleforth College where he played rugby, performed in musicals, and broke their junior cross-country record.

He went on to Gonville and Caius College, Cambridge, intending to study medicine, but just before he was due to begin clinical training contracted polio. After having spent two years away, much of it on an iron lung, the university arranged for him to have individual tuition in Cambridge. In 1956 he became the first clinical medical graduate of Cambridge University (before the official founding of the University Medical School, medical students completed their training in London hospitals), and delivered fifty babies from his adapted wheelchair.

After three years (1956–59) in clinical medicine at Addenbrooke's Hospital, from 1959 to 1964 Inman worked as a medical adviser to ICI Pharmaceutical Division, then joined the UK Department of Health and Social Security as a Senior (later Principal) Medical Officer in 1964. Following the thalidomide tragedy, he was invited by Sir Derrick Dunlop, the founding chairman of the independent Committee on Safety of Drugs, to develop a spontaneous adverse drug reaction reporting system, which became known internationally as the yellow card system.

From 1965 to 1967 Inman designed and directed studies on the role of oral contraceptives in thromboembolic disease. This led to the discovery of the relationship between oestrogen dose and risk of thrombosis and subsequent development of a "mini-pill". He was also involved in key research on sudden asthma deaths, halothane and jaundice, and phenylbutazone and blood dyscrasias. In total Inman published around 100 papers on drug monitoring and safety aspects of various drugs.

After 1975 he drew up proposals for what he termed 'Recorded Release' monitoring method to supplement the voluntary Yellow Card Scheme, which eventually evolved into the post-marketing system used by the Drug Safety Research Unit (DSRU). This arose from his conviction that 'post-marketing studies' being created by drug companies were promotional in nature. As he was unable to get official support for what became prescription event monitoring, in 1980 he resigned from the CSM secretariat to found the DSRU independently, and start a prescription event monitoring system using the "Green Form" questionnaires.

Despite financial pressures, Inman upheld a principle that studies at his Unit should not be directly sponsored by a pharmaceutical company, lest it restrict his ability to investigate issues which he felt were important. His efforts to raise funds for the DSRU were unwelcome to some in the pharmaceutical industry, and some members of that industry attempted to undermine his fund-raising trip to the U.S. However, he raised the necessary finance in four weeks. Inman published a series of bulletins entitled 'PEM News' to report on the progress of prescription event monitoring.

Inman was a consultant to the WHO from 1966 to 1980, participating in a number of the formative meetings setting up international systems. The WHO Adverse Reaction Terminology was established by Barbro Westerholm, Bruce Royal and Inman. The pilot phase of the drug monitoring programme was evaluated favourably by the World Health Assembly and became a continuing WHO programme, based until 1978 in Geneva.

In the aftermath of scares over the safety of Eraldin and Practolol, Franz Gross of the University of Heidelberg convened a conference in 1977. The conference examined the problems of relying solely on spontaneous reporting systems, and the need for adverse reaction data which included information on the number of patients using a particular drug, which connected with Inman's plans for prescription event monitoring.

Inman was mentioned in an investigation into the drugPrimodos in 2020. Inman participated in the review conducted by the Committee on Safety of Medicines in the 1970s. The 2020 report mentioned Inman in a Schering memo stating "he has destroyed all the material on which his investigation is based, or made it unrecognizable, which makes it impossible to trace the individual cases taken into the investigation. I understood Dr. Inman that he did this to prevent individual claims from using this material."

Inman contributed to an initiative on risk management and communication by Wolfson College, Oxford in 1984. At this symposium he outlined the problems of communicating risk perception, and demonstrated the huge differences in the views of medical staff of risk within their own fields. He illustrated the comparative annual risk of doing something (smoking) or being somebody (a president of the United States, or a matador). By contrast, he cited examples of drug withdrawals after a single drug-related death of one in two million. In 1984 he was appointed to the first chair in Pharmacoepidemiology in the United Kingdom, at the University of Southampton.

Inman held strong views about the complete separation of safety monitoring between government and industry, and felt that medical evaluation should be separate from the national licensing authority. He was warned that his clashes with authority would prevent him receiving a knighthood. Lord Butterfield described Inman as "well known world-wide for his foresight and his persistence, which has resulted in his bringing the clinical skills of close observation and detective-like following up of clues to the problems of drug development". Michael O'Donnell wrote, after reading Inman's autobiography, Feeling Better Doctor?: "I suspect you will agree that the author has earned the accolade of one of those beastly people who are always bringing up awkward subjects and making respectable people feel uncomfortable." To the end Inman expressed disappointment that no system, such as a database of pregnant women's drug histories, had been put in place to prevent another thalidomide tragedy.

== Outside interests ==
In the 1950s, after the onset of polio he took up gliding, winning the award in 1960 for best new pilot, and only stopping in the early 1990s. When living in Hever, Kent he regularly went trout fishing, especially at Bewl Bridge. After he retired in 1994 he became medical vice-president of REMAP, which provided bespoke equipment for disabled people.

== Personal life ==
He married in 1962 and had three daughters; another daughter died in infancy. His autobiography tells of how his baby daughter was strangled by an elastic rope in front of her pram, and his campaign (with the health editor of The Daily Mirror) to get the pram's specification changed.

Inman's two books: Don't Tell the Patient – Behind the Drug Safety Net, describing his 30 years in drug safety from 1964 to 1994, and his autobiography, Feeling Better Doctor?, give a full account of his life and career.
