= William Asscher =

Professor Sir William Asscher
- Born: Adolf William Asscher; 1930; Netherlands
- Died: 20 July 2014 (aged 83–84)
- Occupation: Consultant nephrologist
- Employer: University of Cardiff
- Children: Jane Asscher

Sir Adolf William Asscher (1930 – 20 July 2014) was a Dutch-born British consultant nephrologist.

== Personal life ==
Asscher was born in the Netherlands. His family was of Jewish heritage; they were thus deported to Westerbork transit camp, from where his mother secured their release in 1943 by fabricating claims to be of English descent, helped in part by her son's blond hair. The family left the Netherlands in 1947, when his father obtained a position with Shell in London.

He died from bowel cancer on 20 July 2014. An obituary was published in the British Medical Journal.

== Career ==
After national service in the Royal Engineers, he studied medicine at the University of London. He rose to be Professor of Medicine at the University of Cardiff from 1976 to 1987 and Director of the Institute of Nephrology there from 1970 to 1987.

He was appointed Dean of St George's Hospital Medical School in 1988, subsequently becoming its Principal until his retirement in 1996.

He chaired the United Kingdom Department of Health's Committee on the Review of Medicines from 1985 to 1987 and its successor, the Committee on Safety of Medicines 1987 to 1993. He was knighted for this work.
