= Destination (game) =

Taxi-inspired roll-and-move board game

- Cover of Destination London 10th Anniversary Edition
- Designers: Rachel Lowe
- Publishers: Heathside Trading (2022–); She Who Dares UK Ltd (2010–17); RTL Games Ltd (2004–09)
- Publication: 2004; 22 years ago
- Genres: Board game
- Players: 2–6
- Playing time: 60 minutes
- Chance: Moderate (dice rolling, card drawing)
- Age range: 8–12
- Skills: Strategy

Destination is a brand of roll-and-move board games first published in 2004. In the original taxi-themed version, players compete as taxi drivers to acquire play money by moving from destination to destination across the board using dice. The game combines chance from rolling dice and drawing chance cards with a degree of strategic decision-making in planning routes and managing resource cards.

Developed by Portsmouth-based entrepreneur Rachel Lowe, the brand featured in the inaugural British series of Dragons' Den, in which Lowe's investment pitch was rejected. After securing alternative funding, Destination London was published by RTL Games Ltd for Christmas 2004, becoming Hamleys' best-selling game of the year. Since 2004, over twenty-five editions of the game have been published, covering different geographic areas and including licensed versions inspired by Pixar animations, Harry Potter, the London 2012 Olympics, and Downton Abbey.

In May 2009, RTL Games entered administration, and was succeeded by Lowe's new company, She Who Dares UK Ltd. In March 2022, the Destination brand was acquired by Heathside Trading.

== Gameplay ==
Destination is a turn-based, roll-and-move strategic board game. In the original edition, two to six players compete as taxi drivers. Each player starts at a taxi rank with destination cards. They take turns to roll dice, planning routes to reach their destinations across the board. Players can strategically choose routes to maximise money. Having reached their destination, they collect a fare and a fuel card. Players can exchange fuel cards between themselves or buy more at a garage. Among other obstacles, if players land on a traffic light, they must pick up a card, which can yield a range of outcomes, such as free fuel, a speeding fine, and licence points. Players are eliminated if they lose their driving licence or run out of fuel. The winner is the last competitor still in the game at the taxi rank with the most money.

The set-up and game components vary across editions. For example, in Destination Downton Abbey, rather than collecting fares, players – who compete as servants rather than taxi drivers – collect bells from different rooms across the board. In Destination Hogwarts, players compete as new students and win house points by visiting destinations across the board. They can only use one die when travelling by boat or entering the Forbidden Forest, and players can steal points from another player that lands on one of their destination squares. The game ends when the first student returns to their common room, which awards an extra 150 house points.

== History ==
=== Development ===
Entrepreneur Rachel Lowe invented the game while working as a taxi driver. After being encouraged by a university lecturer she was transporting, she enrolled as a mature student to study Law and Business at the University of Portsmouth. In 2003, she founded RTL Games Ltd to design and publish the game. Lowe secured funding for the company from a university competition run by the Portsmouth Centre for Enterprise, and raised £12,000 in sponsorship deals with local companies, including Wightlink and the University of Portsmouth. Financial backers liked that the game could function as a souvenir for tourists.

In September 2004, Lowe appeared in the inaugural British series of Dragons' Den, pitching for £75,000 in return for a 35% stake in the company. RTL Games had already secured a deal to release a first edition, but required further investment before it could launch. After struggling to answer questions on the company's finances and the size of the market, Lowe's pitch was rejected. The investors feared that the game could not compete with Monopoly and would struggle to attract press coverage. Commentators consider the pitch among the greatest missed investment opportunities from the television programme.

Following the failure of the Dragons' Den pitch, RTL Games instead secured a loan from the Portsmouth Area Regeneration Trust Group's community development financial institution, which provided the prerequisite funding for marketing and additional stock.

=== Launch ===
Toy retailer Hamleys released the first edition, Destination London, for Christmas 2004. The game sold 2,500 copies and was the store's most-sold game of the year, outselling established games like Monopoly. It was later stocked in national retailers including Debenhams, Toys "R" Us, and WHSmith. The second edition, Destination Portsmouth, was launched at the city's Cascades Shopping Centre and sold out within three weeks.

At a 2005 toy fair, Lowe struck a deal with Debenhams to stock Birmingham and Cardiff editions of the game. Further regional editions were developed. While most regional editions explored cities and counties in the United Kingdom, overseas editions covered Paris, Dublin, Delhi, and South Africa. In return for sponsorship, local businesses could be displayed on the boards of local editions. Destination South Africa featured website links and contact details for advertised businesses.

Following a deal with The Walt Disney Company, RTL Games released the brand's first licensed edition. Targeting a junior audience, Destination Animation featured characters and destinations from Pixar animated films.

=== She Who Dares UK Ltd ===
In May 2009, RTL Games Ltd entered administration. A Harry Potter–licensed edition of the game, Destination Hogwarts, was delayed after the film release of Harry Potter and the Half Blood Prince was postponed by eight months, missing the Christmas 2008 sales, and the bank refused RTL Games the necessary credit to cover the delay. The company's liquidation was widely publicised, and Lowe lost her house. She considered refusing an MBE which was awarded to her for services to business.

In 2010, a BBC Panorama investigation on bank irresponsibility covered the demise of RTL Games Ltd. Angel investor Simon Dolan approached Lowe after her appearance in the documentary, and together they launched a new lifestyle company, She Who Dares UK Ltd, which acquired the Destination brand. Destination Hogwarts ultimately debuted at the London Film Museum in July 2011.

Lowe secured a licensing deal to release two Olympic-themed editions ahead of the London 2012 Summer Olympics, Destination London 2012 and a junior Destination London 2012 Sports. A further licensing deal followed in Destination Downton Abbey, inspired by the historical drama series.

In 2014, British retailer John Lewis agreed to stock a 10th anniversary edition of Destination London. Other 10th anniversary editions followed in the mid-2010s, including republications of Destination Birmingham and Destination Isle of Wight.

Lowe resigned from She Who Dares UK Ltd in July 2017. In the same year, her new board game company, Rachel Lowe Games & Puzzles, was incorporated; although no new editions were released, Destination formed part of the company's portfolio by the time of the brand's acquisition by Heathside Trading in 2022. In 2020, the company published a licensed board game for period drama series Call the Midwife. While not part of the Destination brand, the gameplay is similar, with players planning routes to deliver babies across the board.

In 2023 Lowe announced a 20th Anniversary Edition of Destination Portsmouth would launch

=== Heathside Trading ===
In March 2022, Destination was acquired by toy and games distributor Heathside Trading, which announced plans to launch national editions in 2023 and 20th anniversary celebratory editions in 2024. In April 2023, Lowe announced a fundraiser to launch a 20th anniversary edition of Destination Portsmouth. Expected to launch in December 2023, the game will feature a double-sided board for day and night shifts.

== Editions ==
Over twenty-five editions of the game have been published.

=== Cities ===
- Destination Birmingham (2007)
- Destination Brighton & Hove
- Destination Bournemouth & Poole (2008)
- Destination Cardiff (2006)
- Destination Delhi
- Destination Dublin (2007)
- Destination London (2004; in Mini, Travel, and 10th Anniversary editions)
- Destination New York
- Destination Norwich
- Destination Paris (2007)
- Destination Portsmouth (2003 in 10th Anniversary; 2023 in 20th Anniversary "Day & Night" edition)
- Destination Sheffield
- Destination Southampton (2008)
- Destination Suffolk

=== Other areas ===
- Destination Great Britain
- Destination Ireland
- Destination Isle of Wight (2008; also in 10th Anniversary edition)
- Destination South Africa (2007)
- Destination Scotland
- Destination The World

=== Themed editions ===
- Destination Animation (Pixar-themed)
- Destination Christmas (2015)
- Destination Downton Abbey
- Destination Hogwarts (2011)
- Destination London 2012
- Destination London 2012 Sports (junior theme)
- Destination The Repair Shop

=== Destination Jigsaw Puzzles ===
Rachel Lowe also Created 17 Editions of the Destination Board Games into 1000 Jigsaws on her Own Website Rachel Lowe Games & Puzzles.

Editions

Cities

- Destination Birmingham (2025)
- Destination Brighton & Hove
- Destination Bournemouth & Poole (2025)
- Destination Cardiff (2025)
- Destination Dublin (2025)
- Destination London (2025)
- Destination New York
- Destination Norwich
- Destination Paris (2025)
- Destination Sheffield
- Destination Southampton (2025)
- Destination Suffolk

=== Other areas ===
- Destination Ireland
- Destination Isle of Wight (2025)
- Destination South Africa (2025)
- Destination Scotland

=== Themed editions ===
- Destination The Repair Shop
