= Commission on Human Medicines =

Committee of the UK Medicines and Healthcare products Regulatory Agency

The Commission on Human Medicines (CHM) is a committee of the UK's Medicines and Healthcare products Regulatory Agency. It was formed in October 2005, and assumed the responsibilities of the Medicines Commission and the Committee on Safety of Medicines. Membership in this various and extensive body is listed on a governmental website.

The CHM's responsibilities include advising the UK government ministers on matters relating to regulation of human medicinal products, giving advice in relation to the safety, quality and efficacy of human medicinal products, and promoting the collection and investigation of information relating to adverse reactions for human medicines.

== Background to the establishment ==
The Medicines and Healthcare products Regulatory Agency undertook a public consultation on proposals to amend the advisory body structure laid down in the Medicines Act 1968 in February 2005. Ministers agreed to a new structure with the establishment of the Commission that amalgamated the responsibilities of the Medicines Commission and the Committee on Safety of Medicines. The commission was established under Section 2 of the Medicines Act 1968 (SI 2005 No. 1094).

== Expert Advisory Groups ==
The work done by the CHM is parcelled out to Expert Advisory Groups (EAGs), which in effect constitute a subcommittee structure. The EAG chairs and members are also required to follow the NHS Code of Practice. Three statutory EAGs - namely Pharmacovigilance; Chemistry, Pharmacy and Standards; and Biologicals/Vaccines - are appointed by the NHS Appointments Commission because they are also standing members of the commission.

A list of all EAGs, as they were on 16 May 2011:

- Anti-infectives / HIV / Hepatology
- Biologicals / Vaccines
- Cardiovascular / Diabetes / Renal / Respiratory / Allergy
- Chemistry, Pharmacy and Standards
- Clinical Trials
- Dermatology / Rheumatology / Gastroenterology / Immunology
- Medicines for Women's Health
- Neurology / Pain Management / Psychiatry
- Oncology and Haematology
- Paediatric Medicines
- Patient Information
- Pharmacovigilance

== Terms of reference ==
The duties of the Commission which came into being on 30 October 2005 are set out in Section 3 of the Medicines Act 1968, as amended by the Medicines (Advisory Bodies) Regulations 2005 and include the following:

- to advise ministers on matters relating to human medicinal products, except those that fall under the remit of Advisory Board on the Registration of Homoeopathic Products (ABRH) and Herbal Medicines Advisory Committee (HMAC);
- to advise the Licensing Authority (LA) where the LA has a duty to consult the commission or where the LA chooses to consult the Commission including giving advice in relation to the safety, quality and efficacy of human medicinal products;
- to consider representations made in relation to the commission's advice (either in writing or at a hearing) by an applicant or by a licence or marketing authorisation holder;
- to promote the collection and investigation of information relating to adverse reactions for human medicines (except for those products that fall within the remit of ABRH or HMAC) for the purposes of enabling such advice to be given.

== Chairs ==
The first Chairman of the Committee on Safety of Medicines was Sir Derrick Dunlop. Other Chairmen are listed at Committee on Safety of Medicines.

The chairs of the Commission on Human Medicines have been

- 2005–2012. Professor Sir Gordon Duff
- 2013-2020. Professor Stuart Ralston
- 2021-Current. Professor Sir Munir Pirmohamed
