= Rachel Lowe =

British entrepreneur (born 1977)

- Born: Rachel Tanya Lowe; August 1977 (age 48–49); Portsmouth, United Kingdom
- Education: University of Portsmouth
- Occupation: Entrepreneur
- Known for: Creator of Destination
- Website: rachellowe.co.uk

Rachel Tanya Lowe MBE (born August, 1977) is a British serial entrepreneur and board games developer. She is best known for developing the Destination series of games, including editions for Toy Story, the London 2012 Olympic Games and Downton Abbey.

She is the founder of Rachel Lowe Games & Puzzles, a company that creates board games under license for brands such as The Elf on the Shelf and Call the Midwife.

== Early life and education ==
Lowe was born in Portsmouth in August 1977, and attended St Edmund's Catholic School and Havant and South Downs College.

While working as a taxi driver and mother-of-two, she developed an idea for a taxi-themed board game. A passenger, a university lecturer, encouraged her to attend university. She enrolled for a degree in Law and Business as a mature student at the University of Portsmouth.

== Career ==
=== Destination board games ===
In 2003, Lowe founded board games designer and publisher RTL Games. She funded production of the board game through an enterprise competition at the University of Portsmouth, and sponsorship deals with local companies.

In September 2004, she appeared in the inaugural British series of Dragons' Den. After struggling to answer questions on the company's finances and the size of the market, her pitch was rejected.

Toy retailer Hamleys launched the first edition, Destination London, for Christmas 2004. The game sold 2,500 copies and was the store's most-sold game of the year, beating classic games like Monopoly. Further versions were produced.

RTL Games entered administration in May 2009. Lowe lost her house and suffered a nervous breakdown. The company's demise was covered by a 2010 BBC Panorama investigation on bank irresponsibility. She Who Dares UK Ltd later acquired the Destination brand and produced further editions of the game, including Destination Hogwarts, Destination London 2012 and Destination Downton Abbey.

In 2014, Lowe appeared on the panel for an episode of BBC's The Apprentice: Your Fired for the candidates’ board game challenge.

=== She Who Dares ===
Lowe's appearance in the BBC Panorama documentary was watched by angel investor Simon Dolan, who provided the funds to launch a new lifestyle company, She Who Dares UK Ltd.

The company produced perfume, jewellery and accessories for women. The company later launched its own fragrances, Eminence and Dalliance, and signed a deal to produce Swarovski fashion accessories. The company's fragrances were sold in Jarrold.

Lowe resigned as a director of She Who Dares in July 2017.

=== Rachel Lowe Games & Puzzles ===
In 2017, Lowe founded Rachel Lowe Games and Puzzles, which creates and sells licensed board games, jigsaw puzzles and card games. The company has created products under license for Hotel Transylvania, Call the Midwife, Mr Bean, Friday Night Dinner, Laurel and Hardy and WWE.

In 2017, Lowe released a board game for the Jumanji film series, which became a top seller on Amazon and won Product of the Year at the Toy Industry Awards in 2019.

In 2019, Lowe launched the WWE: Road to WrestleMania board game, along with a puzzle and playing cards. In the same year, her company was awarded a licence to launch the official Elf on the Shelf Board Game, which launched in December 2020.

Rachel Lowe Games & Puzzles was one of the official licensing partners to develop and launch a range of official Beano puzzles and games to celebrate the 70th anniversary of Dennis the Menace.

In 2025, Rachel Lowe Games & Puzzles Created 17 Editions of the Destination Board Games into 1000 Jigsaw Puzzles on her website.

=== Other activity ===
Lowe is an Entrepreneur in Residence at the University of Portsmouth, where she advises students, alumni and staff on the launch or growth of their businesses.

She serves as a Governor at Portsmouth College, where she sits on Audit and Student Health and Wellbeing committees.

== Recognition ==
In 2006, Lowe was the winner of the NatWest everywoman Award, which celebrates female entrepreneurial success.

She was appointed Member of the Order of the British Empire in 2009 for her services to business in promoting enterprise in schools, colleges, and universities.
