= Scherk (company) =

German cosmetics company

Coordinates: 52.458868°N 13.306533°E

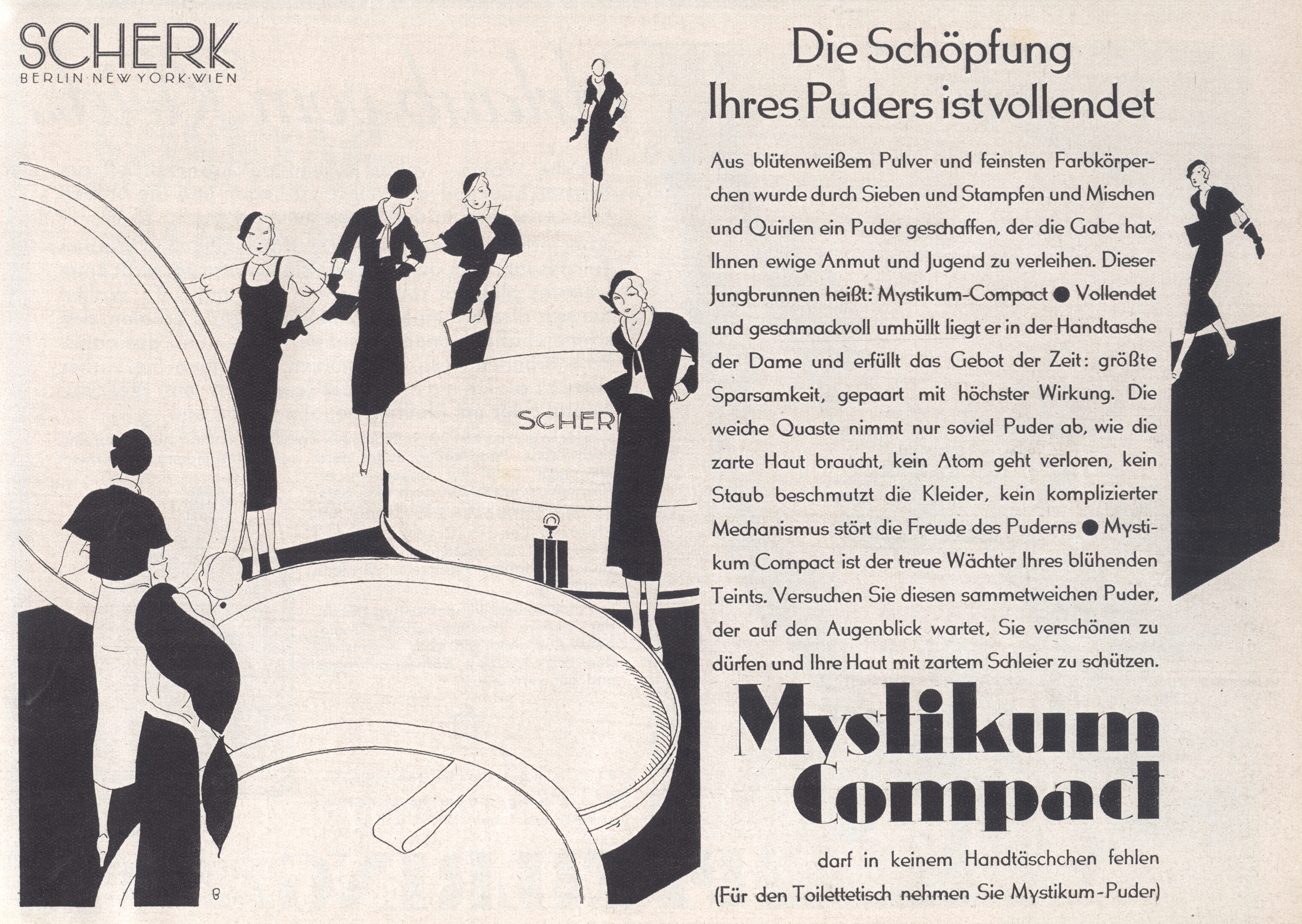

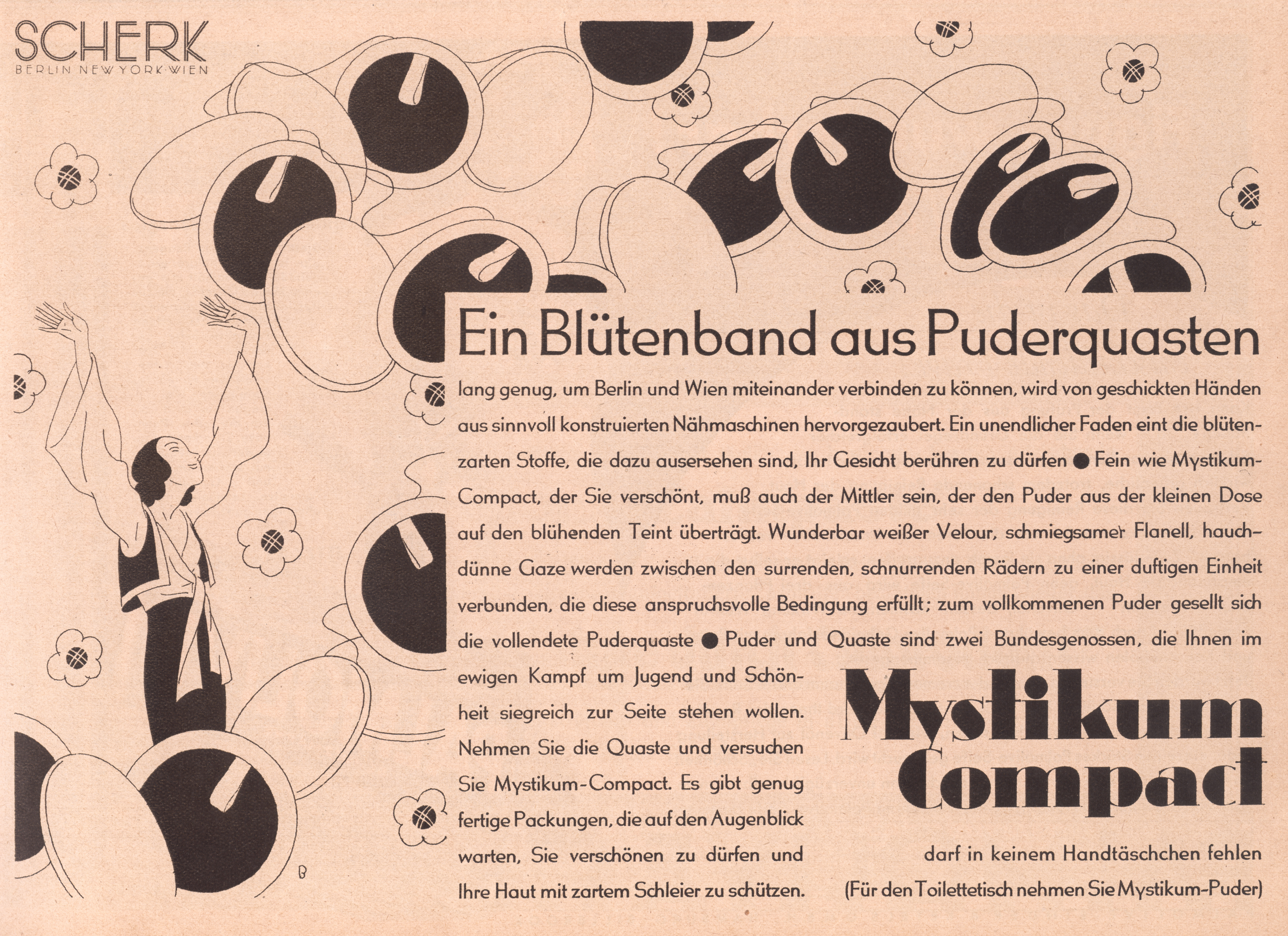

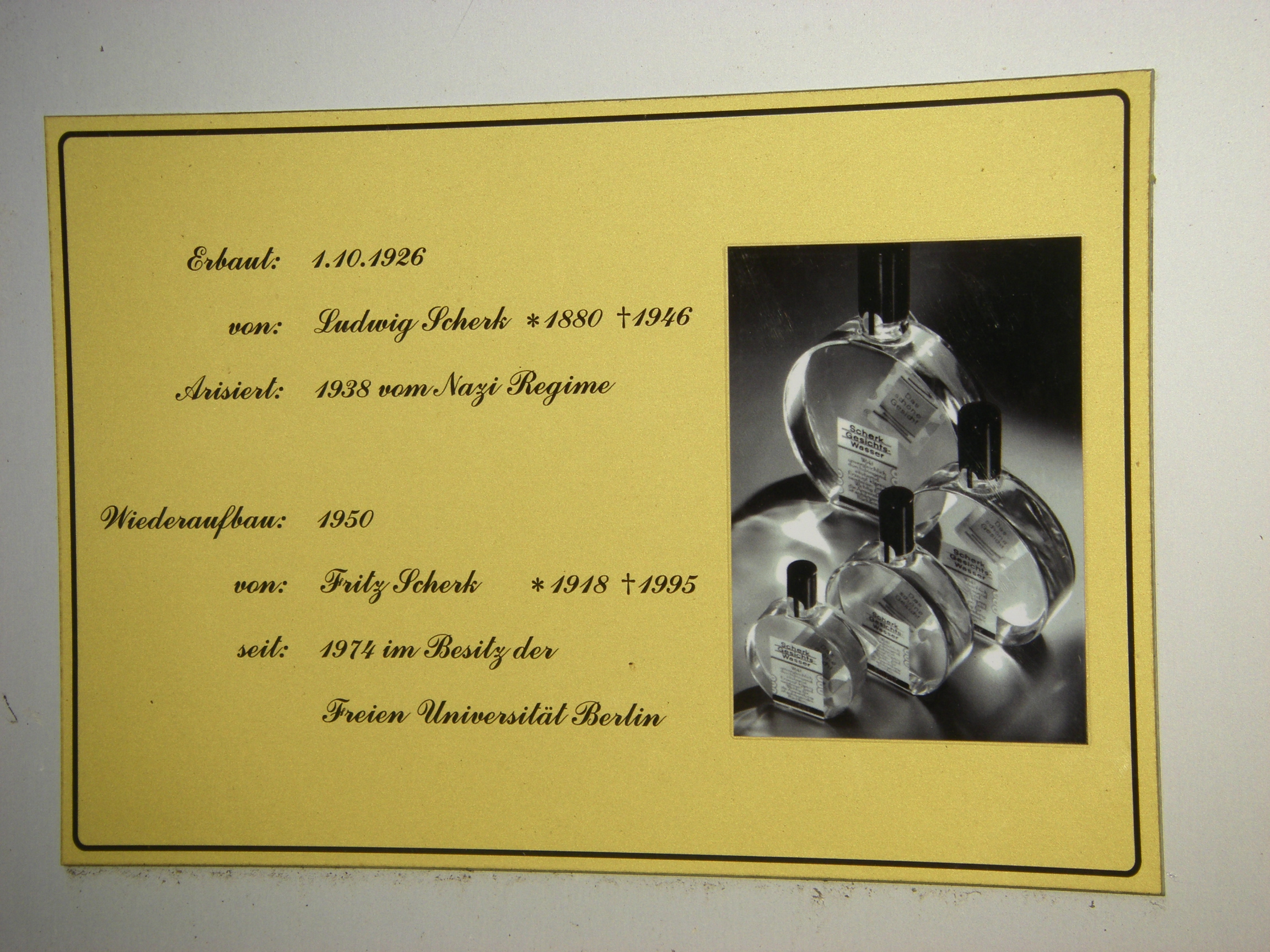
Information board in front of the former factory building

Scherk was a cosmetics company in Berlin, Germany founded by Ludwig Scherk (1880–1946). In Nazi Germany 1938 he was forced to sell it for a low price for Aryanization because he was Jewish. His son Fritz Scherk (1918–1995) bought it back and started a new production in West Berlin in 1951. In 1969 he sold it to the Alberto-Culver Company.
