= Committee on Safety of Medicines =

UK independent advisory committee

The Committee on Safety of Medicines (CSM) was an independent advisory committee that advised the UK Licensing Authority on the quality, efficacy, and safety of medicines.

Following the thalidomide tragedy of 1957 to 1961, in 1963 the government asked Sir Derrick Dunlop to set up a committee to investigate the control and introduction of new medicines in the United Kingdom. In June 1963 the Committee on Safety of Drugs (CSD) was established. As a result of the subsequent report to the Department of Health, which reinforced the need for specially trained doctors (clinical pharmacologists) in pharmaceutical companies and academic departments of medicine, Dunlop became the first chairman of the Committee. Under the Medicines Act 1968, the CSD was replaced in 1970 by the Medicines Commission, which established the Committee on Safety of Medicines (CSM) as a Government advisory committee under Section 4 of the Act.

It was replaced on 30 October 2005 by the Commission on Human Medicines which combines the functions of both the Committee on Safety of Medicines and the Medicines Commission.

== Chairs ==
- The first chairman of the CSD was Sir Derek Dunlop.
- The first chairman of the CSM was Sir Eric Scowan.
- 1980–1986. Professor Sir Abraham Goldberg
- 1987–1992. Professor Sir William Asscher, previously chair of the Committee on the Review of Medicines
- 1993–1998. Professor Sir Michael Rawlins
- 1999–2005. Professor Sir Alasdair Breckenridge

For later chairs, see Commission on Human Medicines

== See also ==
- Medicines and Healthcare products Regulatory Agency
