= Registax =

Image processing software

RegiStax
- Developer: Cor Berrevoets
- Stable release: 6.1.08 / 6 May 2011
- Written in: Delphi 2006
- Operating system: Windows
- Available in: English
- Type: Astronomy software
- License: Freeware
- Website: www.astronomie.be/registax

RegiStax is image processing software for amateur astrophotographers, released as freeware, designed to run under Windows, but which also runs on Linux, under wine.

Its purpose is to produce enhanced images of astronomic observations through combining consecutive photographs (an image "stack") of the same scene that were taken over a short period of time. The process relies on the subject (e.g. a planet) being unchanged between photographs, so that any differences can be assumed to be random noise or atmospheric interference.

The stack of images can be in the form of individual consecutive shots or from frames of a movie camera trained on the scene.

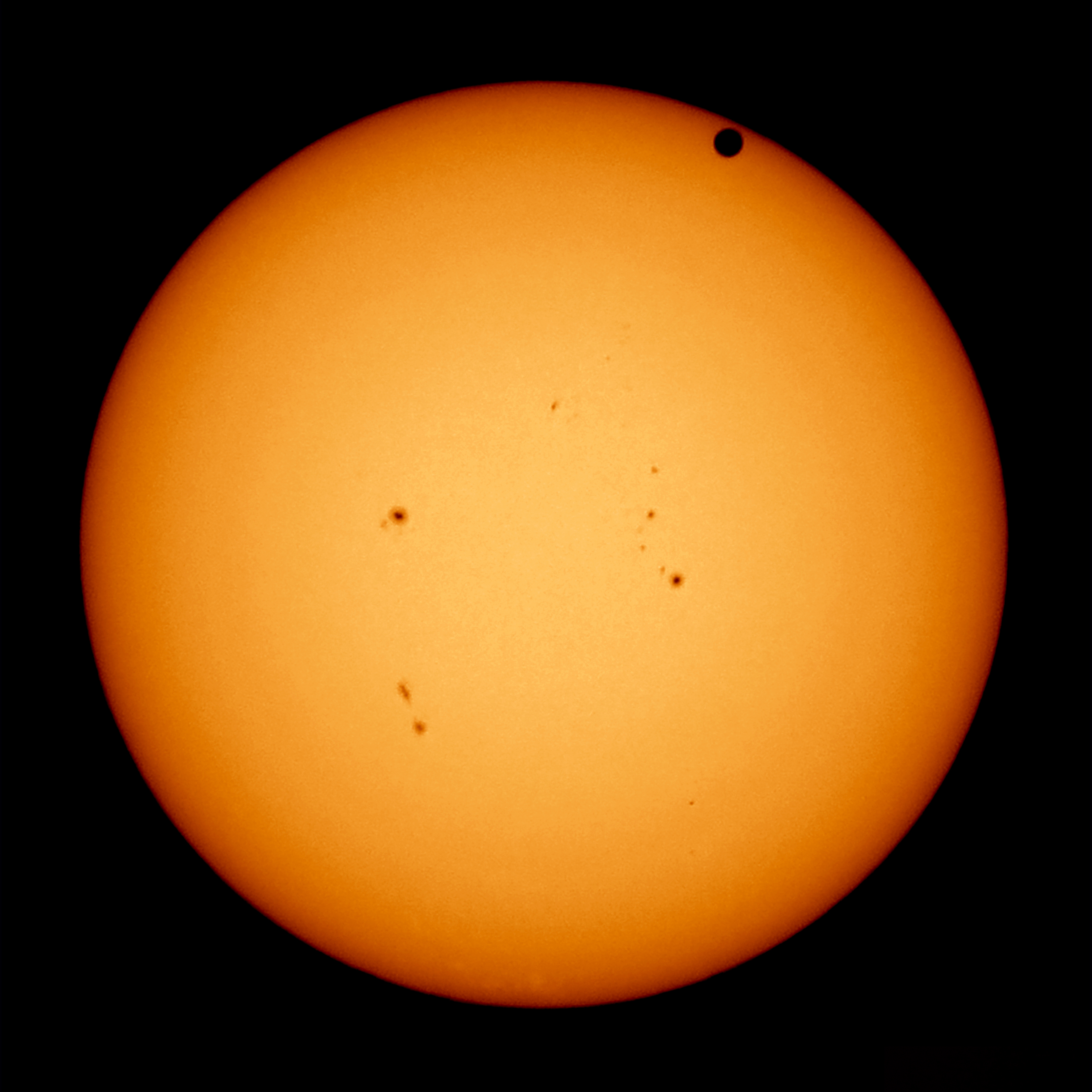
Image of the transit of Venus, shot as consecutive photographs then processed into a single image.

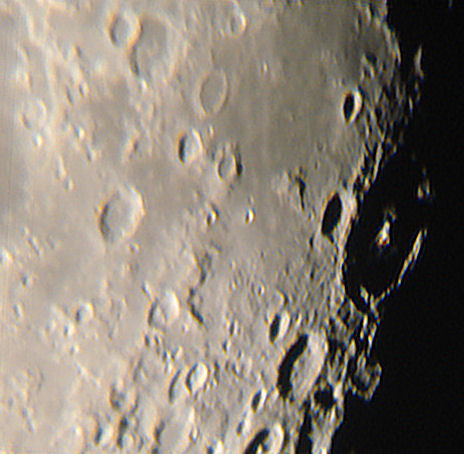
Image of part of the moon, shot as a video then processed into one still image.

== History ==
Cor Berrevoets (Netherlands) began development of the program about 2001, and it was released on 19 May 2002. This initial release (version v1.0.0) had facilities for stack alignment, grading and selection of the images to be merged, and image enhancement using techniques such as wavelet processing. The program was regularly updated by its author and on 6 June 2004 a multi-lingual version was begun (v3) and the program was later available in 15 different languages. To date (September 2022) the latest release is v6.1.0.8 (6 May 2011) which was contributed to by a team of 9 people.
In 2023 the author started work on a new freeware program based on RegiStax called waveSharp. This software does not align/stack images but retains most of the functionality of RegiStax and is available for Windows and Linux. In december 2023 waveSharp 1.0beta was released followed up in december 2024 by waveSharp 2.0.

== See also ==
- Shift and add image processing technique
- Speckle imaging
- Lucky Imaging
