= Isoplanatic patch =

Optical classification

The isoplanatic patch is defined as an arbitrary area of the sky over which the path length of incoming electromagnetic waves (such as light or radio waves) only varies by a relatively small amount relative to their wavelength. Typically this area is measured by angular size. Poor seeing, a larger telescope aperture, or a higher altitude for the dominant turbulent layers, will all decrease the size of a patch. Thus, the patch size decreases with increased atmospheric turbulent activity. In addition, the isoplanatic patch size is proportional to the Fried parameter and the telescope's angular resolution. In order to correct for atmospheric distortion, telescopes fitted with adaptive optics use a bright light source such as a laser to identify the properties of a patch in the area of interest.

== See also ==
- optical resolution
