= Karl Strehl =

German physicist

Karl Wilhelm Andreas Strehl (April 30, 1864 – June 14, 1940) was a German physicist, mathematician, and writer. He is notable for the Strehl ratio, a widely used measurement for the optical quality of an imaging system.

== See also ==
- Strehl ratio
