= Chapman function =

Graph of ch(x, z)

A Chapman function, denoted ch, describes the integration of an atmospheric parameter along a slant path on a spherical Earth, relative to the vertical or zenithal case. It applies to any physical quantity with a concentration decreasing exponentially with increasing altitude. At small angles, the Chapman function is approximately equal to the secant function of the zenith angle, $\sec(z)$.

The Chapman function is named after Sydney Chapman, who introduced the function in 1931. It has been applied for absorption (esp. optical absorption) and the ionosphere.

== Definition ==
In an isothermal model of the atmosphere, the density $\varrho(h)$ varies exponentially with altitude $h$ according to the Barometric formula:

$$\varrho(h) = \varrho_0 \exp\left(- \frac h H \right)$$,

where $\varrho_0$ denotes the density at sea level ($h=0$) and $H$ the so-called scale height. The total amount of matter traversed by a vertical ray starting at altitude $h$ towards infinity is given by the integrated density ("column depth")

$$X_0(h) = \int_h^\infty \varrho(l)\, \mathrm d l = \varrho_0 H \exp\left(-\frac hH \right)$$.

For inclined rays having a zenith angle $z$, the integration is not straight-forward due to the non-linear relationship between altitude and path length when considering the curvature of Earth. Here, the integral reads

$$X_z(h) = \varrho_0 \exp\left(-\frac hH \right) \int_0^\infty \exp\left(- \frac 1H \left(\sqrt{s^2 + l^2 + 2ls \cos z} -s \right)\right) \, \mathrm d l$$,

where we defined $s = h + R_{\mathrm E}$ ($R_{\mathrm E}$ denotes the Earth radius).

The Chapman function $\operatorname{ch}(x, z)$ is defined as the ratio between slant depth $X_z$ and vertical column depth $X_0$. Defining $x = s / H$, it can be written as

$$\operatorname{ch}(x, z) = \frac{X_z}{X_0} = \mathrm e^x \int_0^\infty \exp\left(-\sqrt{x^2 + u^2 + 2xu\cos z}\right) \, \mathrm du$$.

== Representations ==
A number of different integral representations have been developed in the literature. Chapman's original representation reads

$$\operatorname{ch}(x, z) = x \sin z \int_0^z \frac{\exp\left(x (1 - \sin z / \sin \lambda)\right)}{\sin^2 \lambda} \, \mathrm d \lambda$$.

Huestis developed the representation

$$\operatorname{ch}(x, z) = 1 + x\sin z\int_0^z \frac{\exp\left(x (1 - \sin z / \sin \lambda)\right)}{1 + \cos\lambda} \,\mathrm d \lambda$$,

which does not suffer from numerical singularities present in Chapman's representation.

== Special cases ==
For $z = \pi/2$ (horizontal incidence), the Chapman function reduces to

$$\operatorname{ch}\left(x, \frac \pi 2 \right) = x \mathrm{e}^x K_1(x)$$.

Here, $K_1(x)$ refers to the modified Bessel function of the second kind of the first order. For large values of $x$, this can further be approximated by

$$\operatorname{ch}\left(x \gg 1, \frac \pi 2 \right) \approx \sqrt{\frac{\pi}{2}x}$$.

For $x \rightarrow \infty$ and $0 \leq z < \pi/2$, the Chapman function converges to the secant function:

$$\lim_{x \rightarrow \infty} \operatorname{ch}(x, z) = \sec z$$.

In practical applications related to the terrestrial atmosphere, where $x \sim 1000$, $\operatorname{ch}(x, z) \approx \sec z$ is a good approximation for zenith angles up to 60° to 70°, depending on the accuracy required.

== Approximations ==
For $x \geq 50$ and $0 \leq z \leq \pi/2$, the approximation

$$\operatorname{ch}(x, z) = \sqrt{\frac{x \pi}{2}} \exp\left( \frac{x}{2} \cos^2 z\right) \left(1 - \operatorname{erf}\left(\sqrt{\frac{x}{2}} \cos z\right) \right)$$

is accurate to 2 % at $x = 50$ and to 0.1 % at $x = 800$. The accuracy improves with increasing $x$.

== See also ==
- Air mass
- Atmospheric physics
- Ionosphere
