= Zeta Boötis =

Star system in the constellation Boötes

ζ Boötis
- Location of ζ Boötis (circled)

Observation data Epoch J2000 Equinox ICRS
- Constellation: Boötes
- ζ Boo
- Right ascension: 14^{h} 41^{m} 08.95158^{s}
- Declination: +13° 43′ 41.8967″
- Apparent magnitude (V): 3.78 (4.46 + 4.55)
- HIP 71759
- Right ascension: 14^{h} 40^{m} 42.39288^{s}
- Declination: +13° 32′ 03.5621″
- Apparent magnitude (V): 5.925

Characteristics

ζ Boo
- Evolutionary stage: main sequence + main sequence
- Spectral type: A1V
- U−B color index: +0.05
- B−V color index: +0.05

HIP 71759
- Evolutionary stage: main sequence
- Spectral type: F0V
- B−V color index: 0.227
- Variable type: δ Scuti

Astrometry

ζ Boo
Radial velocity (R_{v})	−8.5±0.6 km/s
Proper motion (μ)	RA: +51.95 mas/yr Dec.: −11.08 mas/yr
Parallax (π)	18.56±0.76 mas
Distance	176 ± 7 ly (54 ± 2 pc)
Absolute magnitude (M_{V})	+0.13

HIP 71759
Proper motion (μ)	RA: +54.399 mas/yr Dec.: −15.481 mas/yr
Parallax (π)	19.3257±0.0511 mas
Distance	168.8 ± 0.4 ly (51.7 ± 0.1 pc)
Absolute magnitude (M_{V})	2.37

Orbit
Primary	ζ Boo A
Name	ζ Boo B
Period (P)	125.04+0.24 −0.21 years
Semi-major axis (a)	41.84+0.46 −0.44 au
Eccentricity (e)	0.980450±0.00006
Inclination (i)	125.88±0.16°
Longitude of the node (Ω)	176.63±0.16°
Periastron epoch (T)	2023.9548
Argument of periastron (ω) (secondary)	62.08+0.13 −0.14°

Details

ζ Boo A
Mass	2.21+0.14 −0.05 M_{☉}
Radius	2.6+0.3 −0.4 R_{☉}
Temperature	8,800+1,000 −600 K
Age	560+150 −240 Myr

ζ Boo B
Mass	2.15+0.10 −0.03 M_{☉}
Radius	2.4±0.3 R_{☉}
Temperature	8,750+800 −550 K
Age	560+150 −240 Myr

HIP 71759
Mass	1.79±0.29 M_{☉}
Radius	1.70±0.05 R_{☉}
Luminosity	9.01±0.22 L_{☉}
Surface gravity (log g)	4.23±0.08 cgs
Temperature	7,660±107 K

Other designations
- ζ Boo, 30 Boötis, BD+14°2770, GC 19777, HIP 71795, SAO 101145, ADS 9343, CCDM 14411+1344, WDS J14411+1344
- A: HD 129247, HR 5478
- B: HD 129246, HR 5477
- HIP 71759: BD+14 2769, HD 129153, HR 5473, SAO 101137, TIC 119613557, TYC 917-1472-1

Database references
SIMBAD	data

HIP 71759
SIMBAD	data

Zeta Boötis is a binary star system in the constellation of Boötes that forms a triple star system with HIP 71759. Its name is a Bayer designation that is Latinized from ζ Boötis, and abbreviated Zeta Boo or ζ Boo. They have the Flamsteed designation 30 Boötis. This system is visible to the naked eye as a point of light with an apparent visual magnitude of +3.78. The individual magnitudes of the components differ slightly, with component A having a magnitude of 4.46 and component B at the slightly dimmer magnitude 4.55. The system is located at a distance of approximately 180 light years based on parallax, but is drifting closer to the Sun with a radial velocity of −9 km/s.

== Observations ==
The duplicity of this star was discovered by English astronomer William Herschel in 1796, and their changing positions have been tracked from 1823 onward.

In 1976, T. W. Edwards found a stellar classification of A2III for both inner components, suggesting they may be evolved A-type giant stars. Helmut A. Abt reported a class of A2V in 1981, which matches an A-type main-sequence star. Abt and Nidia Morrell updated the classification to A1V in 1995.

== Characteristics ==
The two components of the pair, Zeta Boötis A and B, are A-type main-sequence stars. Component A has 2.21 times the Sun's mass, 2.6 times the Sun's radius and an effective temperature of 8,800 K. Component B has 2.15 times the Sun's mass, 2.4 times the Sun's radius and an effective temperature of 8,750 K. Their estimated age is 560 million years.

The stars take 125 years to orbit each other. The orbit of this pair has a very high eccentricity of 0.98045, bringing them within 0.818 au at their closest approach (periastron). As of 2025, the eccentricity of this system is possibly the second-highest known, after HIP 26245, whose eccentricity is 0.985±0.002. The last periastron occurred during November 2023. Considering the extreme nature of their orbit, it is unlikely that any exoplanets could have stable orbits around either star.

Together with the star HIP 71759, Zeta Boötis make a triple star system. This distant star has an estimated orbital period of three million years, being at an observed distance of 41,300 au (6,180×10^{9} km; 0.653 ly) from the inner pair. The orbit of this star is likely what forced the high eccentricity orbit of the inner pair, via the Kozai mechanism. It has a class of F0V, matching an F-type main-sequence star. It is a Delta Scuti variable with a brightness amplitude of 0.00134 magnitudes.

== Gallery ==
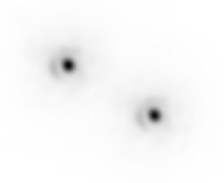
Zeta Bootis imaged with the Nordic Optical Telescope on 13 May 2000 using the lucky imaging method. (The Airy discs around the stars is diffraction from the 2.56m telescope aperture.)

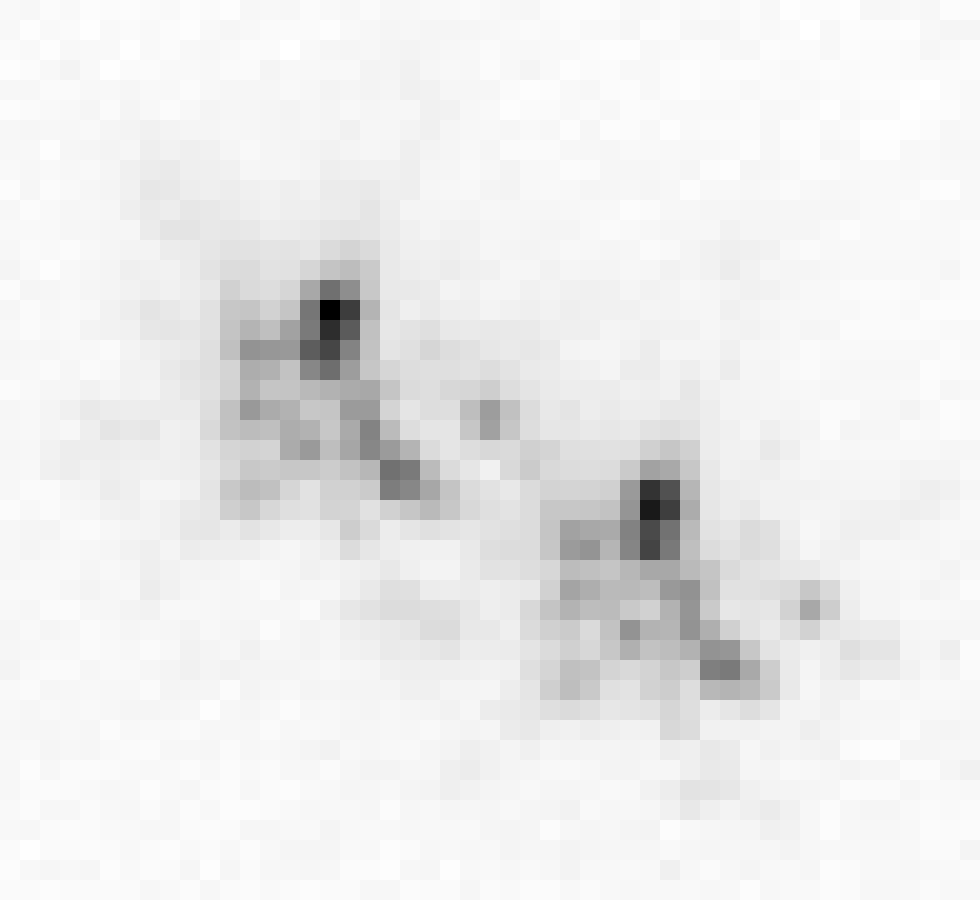
Typical short-exposure image of a binary star, as seen using speckle imaging through the Earth's atmosphere.
