= Fried parameter =

Measure of imaging quality in astronomy

When observing a star through a telescope, the atmosphere distorts the incoming light, making images blurry and causing stars to twinkle. The Fried parameter, or Fried's coherence length, is a quantity that measures the strength of this optical distortion. It is denoted by the symbol $r_0$ and has units of length, usually expressed in centimeters.

The Fried parameter can be thought of as the diameter of a "tube" of relatively calm air through the turbulent atmosphere. Within this area, the seeing is good. A telescope with an aperture diameter $D$ that is smaller than $r_0$ can achieve a resolution close to its theoretical best (the diffraction limit). However, for telescopes with apertures much larger than $r_0$—which includes all modern professional telescopes—the image resolution is limited by the atmosphere, not the telescope's size. The angular resolution of a large telescope without adaptive optics is limited to approximately $\lambda / r_0$, where $\lambda$ is the wavelength of the light observed. At good observatory sites, $r_0$ is typically 10–20 cm at visible wavelengths. Large ground-based telescopes use adaptive optics to compensate for atmospheric effects and reach the diffraction limit.

Technically, the Fried parameter is defined as the diameter of a circular area over which the rms wavefront aberration is equal to 1 radian.

During night, $r_0$ varies on all timescales, which means at brief moments it can be very large and or very small. When imaging bright targets, many brief exposures can be taken and some will be good images with less distortion. The best images can be added to produce a sharper image. This technique is known as lucky imaging.

== Mathematical definition ==
Although not explicitly written in his original article, the Fried parameter at wavelength $\lambda$ can be expressed in terms of the atmospheric turbulence strength $C_n^2(z')$ (which is a function of temperature and turbulence fluctuations) along the light's path $z'$:
$$r_0 = \left [ 0.423 \, k^2 \,   \int_{\mathrm{Path}} C_n^2(z') \, dz' \right ]^{-3/5}$$
where $k = 2 \pi / \lambda$ is the wavenumber. If not specified, the path is assumed to be in the vertical direction.

When observing a star at a zenith angle $\zeta$, the light travels through a longer column of atmosphere by a factor of $\sec \zeta$. This increases the disturbance, resulting in a smaller $r_0$:
$$r_0 = (\cos \zeta)^{3/5} \ r_0^\text{(vertical)}.$$
Because $r_0$ varies with wavelength as $\lambda^{6/5}$, its value is only meaningful when the observation wavelength is specified. If not stated, it is typically assumed to be $\lambda = 0.5\,\mathrm{\mu m}$ (in the visible spectrum).

== See also ==
- Astronomical seeing
- Adaptive optics
- Greenwood frequency
