= Greenwood frequency =

Adaptive optics optimization freuqency

In adaptive optics, the Greenwood frequency is the frequency or bandwidth required for optimal correction with an adaptive optics system. It depends on the transverse wind speed and the turbulence strength in the atmosphere. This can be easily understood since if the turbulence moves over the telescope opening faster, the speed at which the wavefront needs to be corrected is higher, and vice versa. There are various ways to define the Greenwood frequency, but all the definitions attempt to represent the frequency at which the turbulence distortion of the image is changing. The reciprocal of the Greenwood frequency is sometimes known as the Greenwood or atmospheric time constant (τ_{0}). Since the distortions are approximately constant over a period less than this time constant, adapting the optical system at a faster rate yields negligible benefits; conversely, adaptive system performance degrades significantly as the response speed decreases below the Greenwood value, since that means that the distortions are changing faster than the system can adapt. Greenwood frequencies in common applications typically run from tens of hertz up to hundreds or even a few kilohertz, but unusual atmospheric conditions or unusual optical equipment can give very different values.

One expression for the Greenwood frequency is given by

$f_{\mathrm G} = 2.31 \, \lambda^{-6/5} \left[ \sec \zeta \int_{\mathrm{Path}} C_n^2(z) \, v_{\mathrm{Wind}}(z)^{5/3} \, dz \right]^{3/5}$

With $\zeta$ the zenith angle, $v_{\mathrm{Wind}}(z)$ the wind speed as function of height and $C_n^2(z)$ the so-called atmospheric turbulence constant structure function, a measure of the turbulence strength as function of height.

== See also ==
- Astronomical seeing
- Fried parameter
- Adaptive optics
