= Twinkling =

Variation in brightness and the position of stars due to atmospheric refraction

The twinkling of the brightest star in the night sky Sirius (apparent magnitude of −1.1), shortly before upper culmination at the meridian, at 20° above the southern horizon. In 29 seconds, Sirius appears to move 7.5 arcminutes from left to right.

Comparison of twinkling of a star (top) and a planet (bottom). The turbulent atmosphere (shaded blue) distorts their wavefronts (cyan lines) differently with time, like caustics on a swimming pool floor. When a dark part hits the observer (white circle), the object appears dark, and vice versa. An object with larger angular size smears the pattern, yielding less change in intensity.

Twinkling, also called scintillation, is a generic term for variations in apparent brightness, colour, or position of a distant luminous object viewed through a medium. If the object lies outside the Earth's atmosphere, as in the case of stars and planets, the phenomenon is termed astronomical scintillation; for objects within the atmosphere, the phenomenon is termed terrestrial scintillation. As one of the three principal factors governing astronomical seeing (the others being light pollution and cloud cover), atmospheric scintillation is defined as variations in illuminance only.

In simple terms, twinkling of stars is caused by the passing of light through different layers of a turbulent atmosphere. Most scintillation effects are caused by anomalous atmospheric refraction caused by small-scale fluctuations in air density usually related to temperature gradients. Scintillation effects are always much more pronounced near the horizon than near the zenith (directly overhead), since light rays near the horizon must have longer paths through the atmosphere before reaching the observer. Atmospheric twinkling is measured quantitatively using a scintillometer.

The effects of twinkling are reduced by using a larger receiver aperture; this effect is known as aperture averaging. Many modern large telescopes also use adaptive optical systems which precisely deform the figure of a mirror in order to compensate for scintillation.

While light from stars and other astronomical objects is likely to twinkle, twinkling usually does not cause images of planets to flicker appreciably. Stars twinkle because they are so far from Earth that they appear as point sources of light easily disturbed by Earth's atmospheric turbulence, which acts like lenses and prisms diverting the light's path. Large astronomical objects closer to Earth, like the Moon and other planets, can be resolved as objects with observable diameters. With multiple observed points of light traversing the atmosphere, their light's deviations average out and the viewer perceives less variation in light coming from them.

== See also ==
- Adaptive optics
- Interplanetary scintillation
- Observational astronomy
- Twinkle, Twinkle, Little Star
- Twelve Variations on "Ah vous dirai-je, Maman"
