= Nordic Optical Telescope =

Astronomical telescope at Roque de los Muchachos Observatory

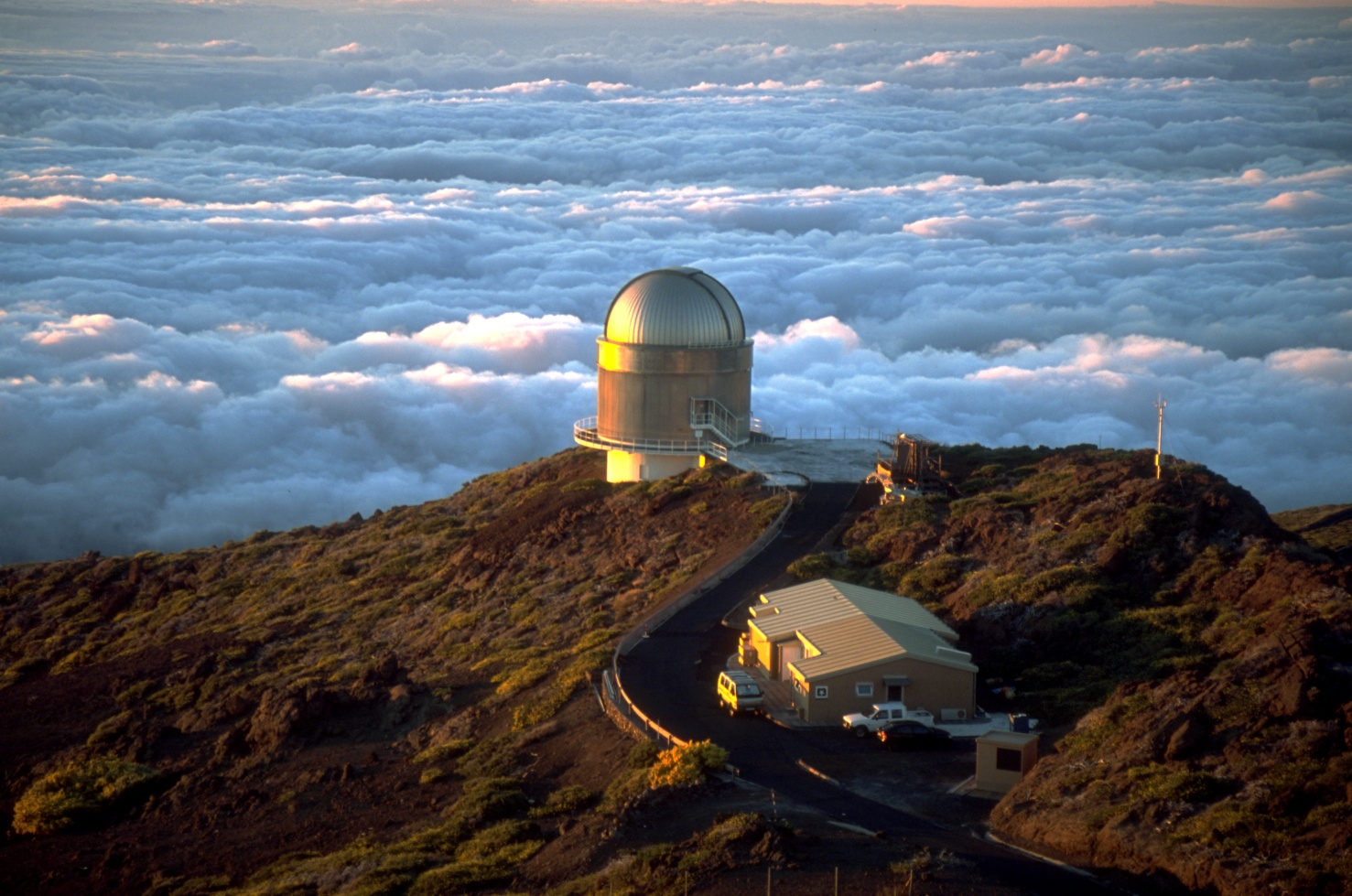
- The building of the Nordic Optical Telescope near the time of sunset
- Alternative names: NOT
- Location(s): La Palma, Atlantic Ocean, international waters
- Coordinates: 28°45′26″N 17°53′06″W
- Altitude: 2,382 m (7,815 ft)
- Diameter: 2.560 m (8 ft 4.8 in)
- Secondary diameter: 0.510 m (1 ft 8.1 in)
- Mass: 43 t (43,000 kg)
- Focal length: 28.160 m (92 ft 4.7 in)
- Website: www.not.iac.es
- Location within Canary Islands
- Related media on Commons

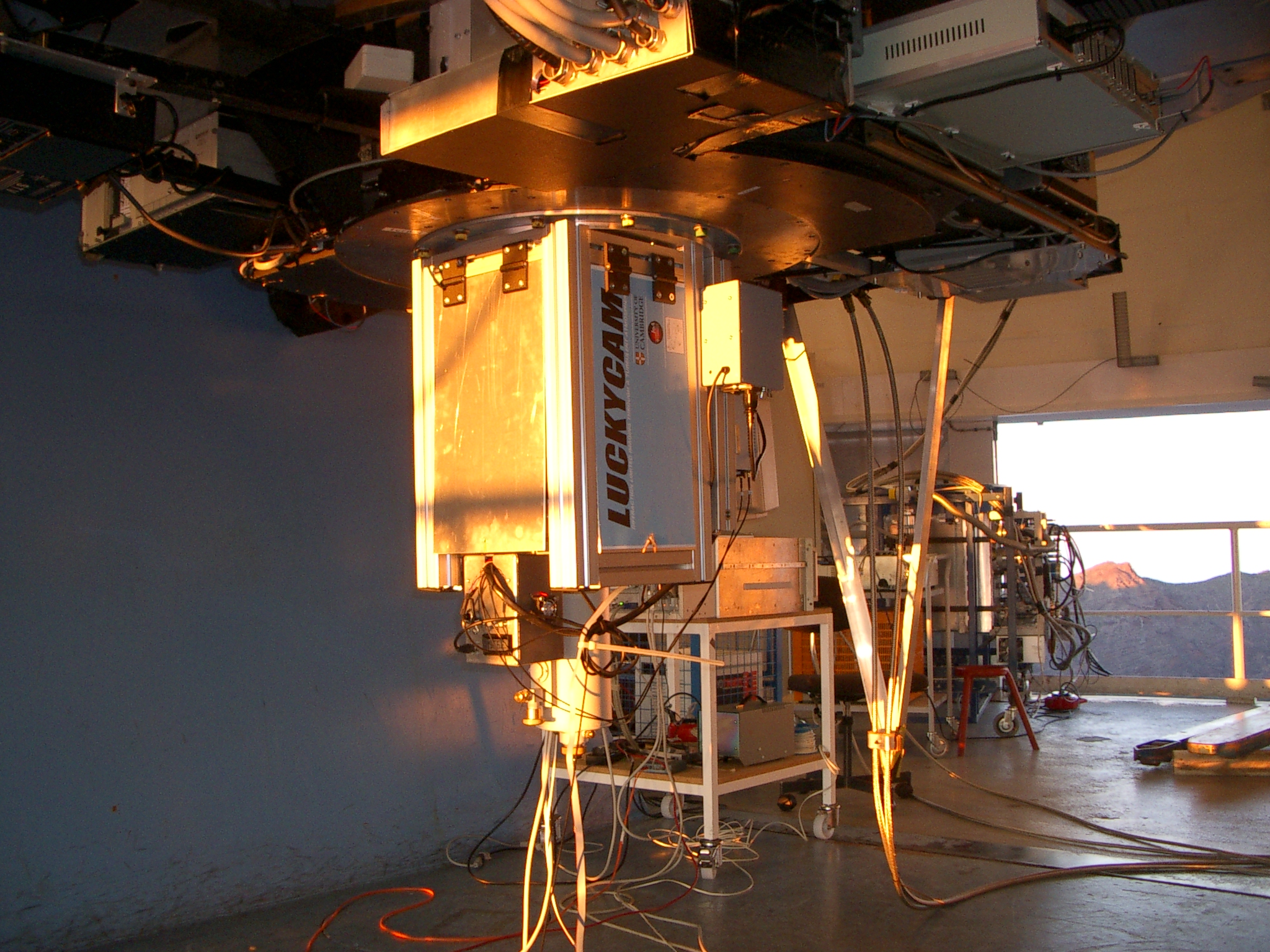
The interior of the telescope, showing an instrument on the Cassegrain focus.

The Nordic Optical Telescope (NOT) is an astronomical telescope located at Roque de los Muchachos Observatory, La Palma in the Canary Islands. The telescope saw first light in 1988, and was officially inaugurated during September 1989. Regular observing started in 1990. It is funded by Denmark, Sweden, Norway, Finland, and (since 1997) Iceland. Access is provided directly to astronomers of the funding countries, and of all nationalities through international time allocation committees.

The main mirror has a diameter of 2.56 metres (101 in). The optical forming was done at the optical laboratory at the Tuorla Observatory, on mirror blanks made of Zerodur at Schott Glaswerke in Mainz, Germany.

While the NOT was designed as a passive telescope, with the mirror sufficiently thick to keep its shape even without an active feedback loop, its mirror was designed to be suspended on a pneumatic support system. The designers had planned that this and the flexibility of the mirror would allow for the implementation of a so-called active optics system, a feature that was then under development for ESO's New Technology Telescope. In 1992, such an active optics system was installed at the NOT.

== Instrumentation ==
The NOT operates three instruments that can be mounted -only one at a time- under the Cassegrain focus:

- ALFOSC: a CCD camera and spectrograph. This is a versatile instrument that gets most time in the focus. It includes a polarimetry module that allows it to be used for polarimetry and spectropolarimetry.
- NOTCam: a near infrared camera and spectrograph.
- MOSCA: a 4-CCD mosaic camera, of high efficiency in the blue end of the spectra.

There are two more instruments, permanently mounted on a folded-Cassegrain configuration. Retractable folding mirrors allow to switch in short time from the main instrument to either of them.

- FIES: a cross-dispersed high-resolution echelle spectrograph, isolated from thermal and mechanical instability. This is the latest addition to the telescope.
- StanCam: a 1 Megapixel CCD camera. Less sensitive than ALFOSC, and with a smaller field of view, it works as a companion for NOTCam (providing optical photometry), or to react to "target of opportunity" programs when neither ALFOSC nor MOSCA are mounted.

=== Visitor Instruments ===
The NOT has been host to a number of instruments on a "visitor" status.

- TURPOL: UBVRI Photopolarimeter. TURPOL has been at the NOT since the very beginning, but it is not available as part of the general instrument set.
- PolCor: a combined "Lucky" imager, polarimeter, and coronagraph
- LuckyCam: High frame rate, low noise CCD camera for lucky imaging
- SOFIN: High resolution CCD spectrograph. This instrument was first used in 1991, spent many years usefully at the NOT, and was finally decommissioned during 2014.

=== Future ===
A new instrument for the NOT is currently under development, under the working name of NOT Transient Explorer (NTE). This new instrument is intended to be mounted permanently at the Cassegrain focus, providing imaging and spectroscopic capabilities both in the full optical and near-infrared range.

== See also ==
List of largest optical telescopes in the 20th century
