= Astronomical optical interferometry =

Astronomical methodology

In optical astronomy, interferometry is used to combine signals from two or more telescopes to obtain measurements with higher resolution than could be obtained with either telescopes individually. This technique is the basis for astronomical interferometer arrays, which can make measurements of very small astronomical objects if the telescopes are spread out over a wide area. If a large number of telescopes are used a picture can be produced which has resolution similar to a single telescope with the diameter of the combined spread of telescopes. These include radio telescope arrays such as VLA, VLBI, SMA, astronomical optical interferometer arrays such as COAST, NPOI and IOTA, resulting in the highest resolution optical images ever achieved in astronomy. The VLT Interferometer is expected to produce its first images using aperture synthesis soon, followed by other interferometers such as the CHARA array and the Magdalena Ridge Observatory Interferometer which may consist of up to 10 optical telescopes. If outrigger telescopes are built at the Keck Interferometer, it will also become capable of interferometric imaging.

== Types of interferometers ==
Astronomical interferometers come in two types—direct detection and heterodyne. These differ only in the way that the signal is transmitted. Aperture synthesis can be used to computationally simulate a large telescope aperture from either type of interferometer.

In the near future other arrays are expected to release their first interferometric images, including the ISI, VLTI, the CHARA array and the MRO interferometers.

At the beginning of the 21st century, the VLTI and Keck Interferometer large-telescope arrays came into operation, and the first interferometric measurements of the brightest few extra-galactic targets were performed.

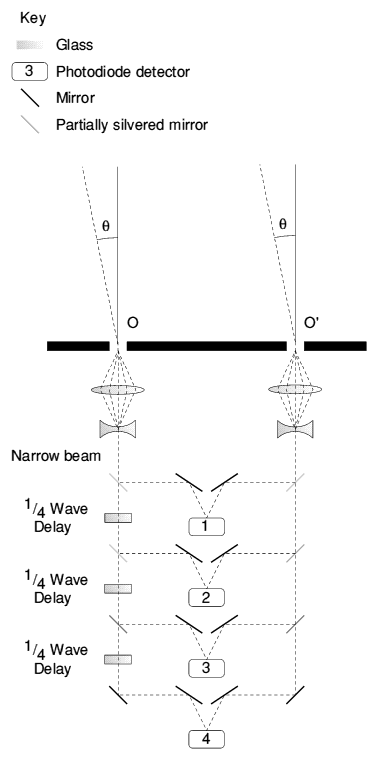
A simple two-element optical interferometer. Light from two small telescopes (shown as lenses) is combined using beam splitters at detectors 1, 2, 3 and 4. The elements create a 1/4 wave delay in the light, allowing the phase and amplitude of the interference visibility to be measured, thus giving information about the shape of the light source.	A single large telescope with an aperture mask over it (labelled Mask), only allowing light through two small holes. The optical paths to detectors 1, 2, 3 and 4 are the same as in the left-hand figure, so this setup will give identical results. By moving the holes in the aperture mask and taking repeated measurements, images can be created using aperture synthesis, which would have the same quality as would have been given by the right-hand telescope without the aperture mask. In an analogous way, the same image quality can be achieved by moving the small telescopes around in the left-hand figure – this is the basis of aperture synthesis, using widely separated small telescopes to simulate a giant telescope.

== Astronomical direct-detection interferometry ==
One of the first astronomical interferometers was built on the Mount Wilson Observatory's reflector telescope in order to measure the diameters of stars. This method was extended to measurements using separated telescopes by Johnson, Betz and Townes (1974) in the infrared and by Labeyrie (1975) in the visible. The red giant star Betelgeuse was among the first to have its diameter determined in this way. In the late 1970s improvements in computer processing allowed for the first "fringe-tracking" interferometer, which operates fast enough to follow the blurring effects of astronomical seeing, leading to the Mk I, II and III series of interferometers. Similar techniques have now been applied at other astronomical telescope arrays, such as the Keck Interferometer and the Palomar Testbed Interferometer.

Techniques from Very Long Baseline Interferometry (VLBI), in which a large aperture is synthesized computationally, were implemented at optical and infrared wavelengths in the 1980s by the Cavendish Astrophysics Group. The use of this technique provided the first very high resolution images of nearby stars. In 1995 this technique was demonstrated on an array of separate optical telescopes as a Michelson Interferometer for the first time, allowing a further improvement in resolution, and allowing even higher resolution imaging of stellar surfaces. The same technique has now been applied at a number of other astronomical telescope arrays, including the Navy Prototype Optical Interferometer and the IOTA array and soon the VLTI, CHARA array and MRO Interferometers.

Projects are now beginning that will use interferometers to search for extrasolar planets, either by astrometric measurements of the reciprocal motion of the star (as used by the Palomar Testbed Interferometer and the VLTI) or through the use of nulling (as will be used by the Keck Interferometer and Darwin).

A detailed description of the development of astronomical optical interferometry can be found here. Impressive results were obtained in the 1990s, with the Mark III measuring diameters of hundreds of stars and many accurate stellar positions, COAST and NPOI producing many very high resolution images, and ISI measuring stars in the mid-infrared for the first time. Additional results included direct measurements of the sizes of and distances to Cepheid variable stars, and young stellar objects.

Interferometers are seen by most astronomers as very specialized instruments, as they are capable of a very limited range of observations. It is often said that an interferometer achieves the effect of a telescope the size of the distance between the apertures; this is only true in the limited sense of angular resolution. The combined effects of limited aperture area and atmospheric turbulence generally limit interferometers to observations of comparatively bright stars and active galactic nuclei. However, they have proven useful for making very high precision measurements of simple stellar parameters such as size and position (astrometry) and for imaging the nearest giant stars. For details of individual instruments, see the list of astronomical interferometers at visible and infrared wavelengths.

=== Astronomical heterodyne interferometry ===
Radio wavelengths are much longer than optical wavelengths, and the observing stations in radio astronomical interferometers are correspondingly further apart. The very large distances do not always allow any usable transmission of radio waves received at the telescopes to some central interferometry point. For this reason many telescopes instead record the radio waves onto a storage medium. The recordings are then transferred to a central correlator station where the waves are interfered.

Historically the recordings were analog and were made on magnetic tapes. This was quickly superseded by the current method of digitizing the radio waves, and then either storing the data onto computer hard disks for later shipping, or streaming the digital data directly over a telecommunications network e.g. over the Internet to the correlator station. Radio arrays with a very broad bandwidth, and also some older arrays, transmit the data in analogue form either electrically or through fibre-optics.

A similar approach is also used at some submillimetre and infrared interferometers, such as the Infrared Spatial Interferometer. Some early radio interferometers operated as intensity interferometers, transmitting measurements of the signal intensity over electrical cables to a central correlator. A similar approach was used at optical wavelengths by the Narrabri Stellar Intensity Interferometer to make the first large-scale survey of stellar diameters in the 1970s.

At the correlator station, the actual interferometer is synthesized by processing the digital signals using correlator hardware or software. Common correlator types are the FX and XF correlators. The current trend is towards software correlators running on consumer PCs or similar enterprise hardware. There also exists some amateur radio astronomy digital interferometers, such as the ALLBIN of the European Radio Astronomy Club.

As most radio astronomy interferometers are digital they do have some shortcomings due to the sampling and quantization effects as well as the need for much more computing power when compared to analog correlation. The output of both a digital and analog correlator can be used to computationally synthesize the interferometer aperture in the same way as with direct detection interferometers (see above).

== Using gamma-ray telescopes ==
Optical intensity interferometry has been revived, measuring the width of giant stars using the optical instruments of the Cherenkov Telescope Array, a ground-based Cherenkov-radiation-based gamma-ray telescope normally intended to observe atmospheric Cherenkov-radiation so as to detect gamma-ray photons.

== See also ==
- Aperture synthesis
- Astronomical interferometer
- List of astronomical interferometers at visible and infrared wavelengths
- List of types of interferometers
- Multiple satellite imaging
- Optical coherence tomography
- Very-long-baseline interferometry
- Wave interference
- List of stars with resolved images
