= Navy Precision Optical Interferometer =

US Navy astronomical interferometer

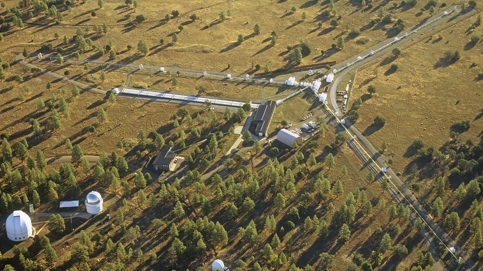
- Navy Precision Optical Precision Interferometer at the Anderson Mesa Station of Lowell Observatory.
- Alternative names: NPOI
- Location: Arizona
- Coordinates: 35°05′45″N 111°32′02″W
- Altitude: 2,163 m (7,096 ft)
- Website: lowell.edu/research/research-facilities/npoi/
- Location within the United States
- Related media on Commons

The Navy Precision Optical Interferometer (NPOI) is an American astronomical interferometer, with the world's largest baselines, operated by the Naval Research Laboratory (NRL). Until the end of 2022, it was operated by a consortium that included NRL with the Naval Observatory Flagstaff Station (NOFS) and Lowell Observatory. The NPOI primarily produces space imagery and astrometry, the latter a major component required for the safe position and navigation of all manner of vehicles for the DoD. The facility is located at Lowell's Anderson Mesa Station on Anderson Mesa about 25 kilometers (16 mi) southeast of Flagstaff, Arizona (US). Until November 2011, the facility was known as the Navy Prototype Optical Interferometer (NPOI). Subsequently, the instrument was temporarily renamed the Navy Optical Interferometer, and now permanently, the Kenneth J. Johnston Navy Precision Optical Interferometer (NPOI) – reflecting both the operational maturity of the facility, and paying tribute to its principal driver and retired founder, Kenneth J. Johnston.

The NPOI project was initiated by the United States Naval Observatory (USNO) in 1987. Lowell joined the project the following year when the USNO decided to build the NPOI at Anderson Mesa. The first phase of construction was completed in 1994, which allowed the interferometer to see its first fringes, or light combined from multiple sources, that year. The Navy began regular science operations in 1997. The NPOI has been continuously upgraded and expanded since then. The workings of NPOI as a classic interferometer, are described at Scholarpedia, and at the NPOI site.

== Description ==
The NPOI is an astronomical interferometer laid out in a three-arm "Y" configuration, with each equally-spaced arm measuring 250 meters (820 ft) long. There are two types of stations that can be used in the NPOI. Astrometric stations, used to measure the positions of celestial objects very accurately, are fixed units placed 21 meters (69 ft) apart, with one on each arm and one at the center. Imaging stations can be moved to one of nine positions on each arm, and up to six can be used at one time to perform standard observing. Light from either type of station is first directed into the feed system, which consists of long pipes which have been evacuated of all air. They lead to a switchyard of mirrors, where the light is directed into the six Long Delay Lines, which is another set of long pipes that compensate for the different distances to each station. The light is then sent into the Beam Combining Facility, where it enters the Fast Delay Lines. This third set of evacuated pipes contains mechanisms that move mirrors back and forth with a very high degree of accuracy. These compensate for the movement of the mirrors as they track an object across the sky, and for other effects. Finally, the light leaves the pipes inside the BCF and goes to the Beam Combining Table, where the light is combined in a way that allows images to be formed.

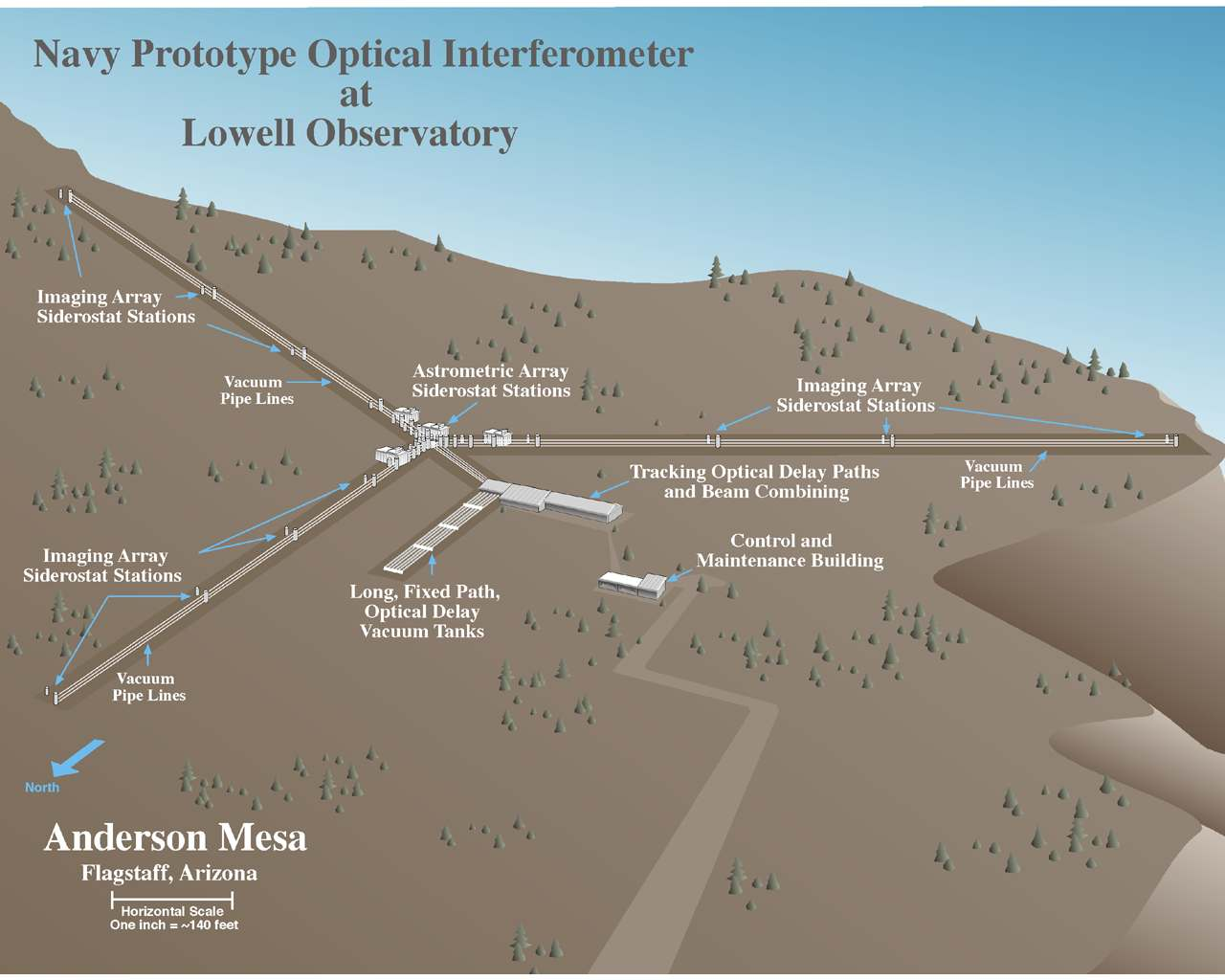
Navy Precision Optical Interferometer layout.

Both types of station have three elements: a siderostat, a Wide Angle Star Acquisition (WASA) camera, and a Narrow Angle Tracking (NAT) mirror. The first is a precisely-ground flat mirror 50 cm (20 in) in diameter. The WASA cameras control the aiming of the mirror at the celestial target. The reflected light from the siderostat is directed through a telescope which narrows the beam down to the diameter of the pipes, which is 12 cm (4.7 in). The light then hits the mirror of the NAT, which compensates for atmospheric effects and directs the light into the feed system.

In 2009 NOFS began final plans for NPOI to incorporate four 1.8 m (71 in) aperture optical-infrared telescopes into the array, which were accepted by the Navy in 2010, and assigned to the Naval Observatory Flagstaff Station. They were originally intended to be "outrigger" telescopes for the W. M. Keck Observatory in Hawaii, but were never installed and incorporated into Keck's interferometer. Three telescopes were planned for initial installation, though these plans have been shelved. The fourth is currently at Mount Stromlo Observatory in Australia and was to have been incorporated at some point in the future. The new telescopes were to help with faint object imaging and improved absolute astrometry, due to their greater light-gathering abilities than the existing siderostats.

NRL operates and leads the science for the NPOI.

With the cancellation of the four 1.8m "outrigger" telescope project, installation plans for an array of three 1.0 meter telescopes were developed by NRL and Lowell Observatory, based on the funded science performed. Three PlaneWave CDK1000 telescopes were purchased for this project, with initial installation for two of the telescopes completed in 2020.

NPOI is an example of the Michelson Interferometer design, with the principal science managed by NRL. NPOI is one of the few major instruments globally which can conduct optical interferometry. See an illustration of its layout, at bottom. NOFS has used NPOI to conduct a wide and diverse series of scientific studies, beyond just the study of absolute astrometric positions of stars,; additional NOFS science at NPOI includes the study of binary stars, Be Stars, Oblate stars, rapidly rotating stars, those with starspots, and the imaging of stellar disks (the first in history) and flare stars. In 2007–2008, NRL with NOFS used NPOI to obtain first-ever closure phase image precursors of satellites orbiting in geostationary orbit.

== Discussion ==
Optical interferometers are extremely complex, unfilled aperture photon-collecting telescopes in the visual (sometimes the near infrared, too), which produce synthesized images and fringe data "on the fly" (unlike radio interferometers which record the data for later synthesis), essentially by taking an inverse Fourier transform of the incoming data. Astrometry is understood by precisely measuring delay line additions while fringing, to match the light-path differences from baseline ends. Using essentially trigonometry, the angle and position of where the array is "pointed" can be determined, thus inferring a precise position on the sphere of the sky.

Only a few exist that can be considered operational. To date NPOI has produced the highest-resolution optical images of any astronomical instrument, though this may change when the CHARA array and Magdalena Ridge Observatory Interferometer begin optical-band operations. The first astronomical object imaged (resolved) by NPOI was Mizar, and since, a significant amount of astrometry, reference tie frame, rapid rotator star, and Be stellar disk study has been performed. NPOI is capable of determining positions of celestial objects to a few milli-arcseconds, in part due to the optical anchoring of its components using a complex metrology array of lasers that connect main optical elements to each other and to bedrock.

Many specialized lasers are also used to align the long train of optics. The NPOI siderostat array and the CHARA Array are the world's only long-baseline optical interferometers that can simultaneously co-phase six elements.

== See also ==
- List of astronomical interferometers at visible and infrared wavelengths
- List of telescope types
