= 2026 JH2 =

Near-Earth asteroid

2026 JH_{2}
Discovery
- Discovered by: Mt. Lemmon Survey
- Discovery site: Mt. Lemmon Obs.
- Discovery date: 10 May 2026

Designations
- Alternative designations: CELU1Q2
- Minor planet category: NEO · Apollo

Orbital characteristics
- Epoch 21 November 2025 (JD 2461000.5)
- Uncertainty parameter 7
- Observation arc: 7 days
- Aphelion: 3.827±0.004 AU
- Perihelion: 1.011 AU
- Semi-major axis: 2.419±0.002 AU
- Eccentricity: 0.5822±0.0004
- Orbital period (sidereal): 3.76 yr (1,374 d)
- Mean anomaly: 311.942°±0.066°
- Mean motion: 0° 15^{m} 43.298^{s} / day
- Inclination: 6.007°±0.003°
- Longitude of ascending node: 57.481°±0.002°
- Argument of perihelion: 185.585°±0.001°
- Earth MOID: 0.0007345 AU (109,880 km)

Physical characteristics
- Mean diameter: 15–35 m
- Synodic rotation period: 21 min (0.35 h)
- Absolute magnitude (H): 26.32±0.40

2026 JH_{2} is a small near-Earth asteroid with a diameter between 15 and 35 metres (49 and 110 feet). It was discovered by the Mount Lemmon Survey in Tucson, Arizona on 10 May 2026. Classified as an Earth-crossing Apollo asteroid, 2026 JH_{2} passed no closer than 91,572 ± 186 kilometres (56,900 ± 116 mi) from Earth on 18 May 2026, far enough to have posed no threat. During its close approach to Earth, it brightened to an apparent magnitude of up to 11.5, bright enough to have been seen by a small telescope under dark skies.

== Discovery ==
2026 JH_{2} was discovered by the Mount Lemmon Survey in Tucson, Arizona on 10 May 2026. The object was initially detected at a very faint apparent magnitude of 21, and was briefly codenamed CELU1Q2. Over the span of 2 days, other observatories including Steward Observatory, Farpoint Observatory, and Magdalena Ridge Observatory performed follow-up observations of the asteroid and confirmed its orbit. The Minor Planet Center announced the asteroid's discovery on 12 May 2026 and gave it the provisional designation 2026 JH_{2}.

== Orbit and close approach ==
2026 JH_{2} is a near-Earth asteroid following an elliptical orbit around the Sun, stretching from the vicinity of Earth (perihelion 1.01 astronomical units or AU) to almost the distance of Jupiter (aphelion 3.83 AU). 2026 JH_{2} is classified as an Apollo asteroid because it crosses the orbit of Earth with a semi-major axis beyond Earth's orbit (>1 AU).

2026 JH_{2} safely passed close to Earth on 18 May 2026. It passed no closer than 91,572 ± 186 kilometres (56,900 ± 116 mi) from the planet at the time of its closest approach on May 18, 22:00 Universal Time (UT). About three hours before its closest approach to Earth, the asteroid had passed by the Moon at a much greater distance of 422,530 ± 137 km (262,548 ± 85 mi).

2026 JH_{2} gradually brightened as it approaches Earth. From May 12 to the end of May 17, the asteroid resided in the northern sky at declinations +31 to +25°. On May 18, the asteroid crossed the celestial equator at apparent magnitude 13 and entered the southern sky at around 18:00 UT. The asteroid reached a peak brightness of magnitude 11.5 at declinations −30° to −50°, where it could be observed by small telescopes under dark skies.

== Physical characteristics ==
Little is known about the physical properties of 2026 JH_{2}. Based on its brightness or absolute magnitude of 26.1, its diameter is estimated to be between 15 and 35 metres (49 and 110 feet), depending on the reflectivity or albedo of its surface. This size range makes 2026 JH_{2} about the same size as the meteor that caused damage over the Russian city of Chelyabinsk in 2013. NASA's Goldstone Radar was planned to take radar measurements of 2026 JH_{2}'s position and size during its May 18 close approach, though results have not yet been published. Observations by Petr Pravec found that 2026 JH_{2} has a rotation period of 21 minutes (0.35 h). The asteroid's brightness varies by 0.36 magnitudes as it rotates, which indicates it has a somewhat elongated shape.

== See also ==
- 2024 YR4 – a similarly sized near-Earth asteroid that received much attention during 2024–2025 because of its possibility of impact
