= United States Naval Observatory Flagstaff Station =

Astronomical observatory in Arizona, US

- Alternative names: NOFS
- Organization: United States Naval Observatory
- Observatory code: 689
- Location: Coconino County, near Flagstaff, Arizona
- Coordinates: 35°11′03″N 111°44′26″W
- Altitude: 2,273 m (7,457 ft)
- Established: 1955
- Website: United States Naval Observatory's Flagstaff Station

Telescopes
- Kaj Strand Telescope: 1.55 m (61 in) reflector
- DFM/Kodak/Corning: 1.3 m reflector
- Unnamed telescope: 1.0 m (40 in) Ritchey–Chrétien reflector
- Flagstaff Astrometric Scanning Transit Telescope: 8-inch (20 cm) catadioptric
- Navy Precision Optical Interferometer: interferometer (Located at Anderson Mesa)
- Related media on Commons

The United States Naval Observatory Flagstaff Station (NOFS), is an astronomical observatory near Flagstaff, Arizona, US. It is the national dark-sky observing facility under the United States Naval Observatory (USNO). NOFS and USNO combine as the Celestial Reference Frame manager for the U.S. Secretary of Defense.

== General information ==
The Flagstaff Station is a command which was established by USNO (due to a century of eventually untenable light encroachment in Washington, D.C.) at a site five miles (8.0 km) west of Flagstaff, Arizona, in 1955, and has positions for primarily operational scientists (astronomers and astrophysicists), optical and mechanical engineers, and support staff.

Work at NOFS covers the gamut of astrometry and astrophysics in order to facilitate its production of accurate/precise astronomical catalogs. Also, owing to the celestial dynamics (and relativistic effects) of the huge number of such moving objects across their own treks through space, the time expanse required to pin down each set of celestial locations and motions for a perhaps billion-star catalog, can be quite long. Multiple observations of each object may themselves take weeks, months or years, by themselves.

The United States Naval Observatory, Flagstaff Station celebrated its 50th anniversary of the move there from Washington, D.C., in late 2005. Dr. John Hall, Director of the Naval Observatory's Equatorial Division from 1947, founded NOFS. Dr. Art Hoag became its first director in 1955 (until 1965); both later were to also become directors of nearby Lowell Observatory. NOFS has had 6 directors since 1955; its current and 7th acting director is Dr. Scott Dahm.

NOFS remains active in supporting regional dark skies, both to support its national protection mission, and to promote and protect a national resource legacy for generations of humans to come.

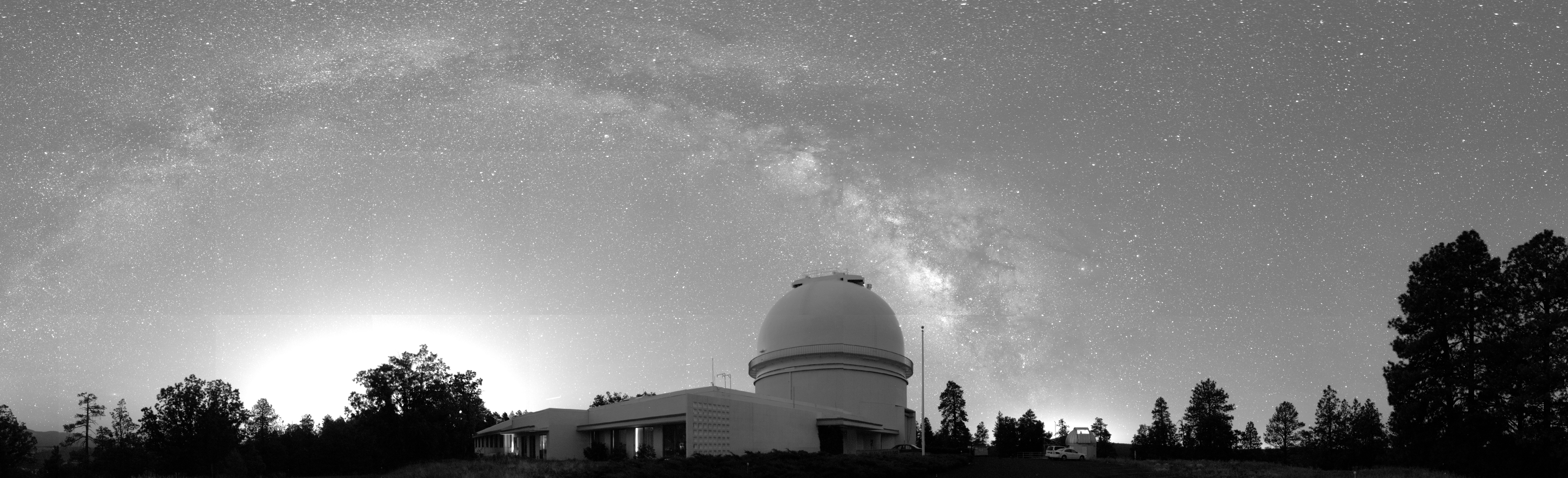
Dark-sky operations at the United States Naval Observatory Flagstaff Station (NOFS)

== Site description ==
NOFS is adjacent to Northern Arizona's San Francisco Peaks, on the alpine Colorado Plateau and geographically above the Mogollon Rim. Flagstaff and Coconino County minimize northern Arizona light pollution through legislation of progressive code – which regulates local lighting.

Indeed, despite a half-century-young history, NOFS has a rich heritage which is derived from its parent organization, USNO, the oldest scientific institution in the U.S. Notable events have included support to the Apollo Astronaut program hosted by USGS' nearby Astrogeology Research Center; and the discovery of Pluto's moon, Charon, in 1978 (discussed below). At an elevation of approximately 7,500 feet (2,300 m), NOFS is home to a number of astronomical instruments (some also described in the worldwide list of optical telescopes); some additional instrumentation is on nearby Anderson Mesa. NOFS (with parent USNO) also do fundamental science on the UKIRT Infrared telescope in Hawaii.

The Navy provides stewardship of the facility, land and related dark sky protection efforts through its Navy Region Southwest, through Naval Air Facility El Centro.

=== Kaj Strand Telescope ===
The 1.55-meter (61-inch) Kaj Strand Telescope (or Kaj Strand Astrometric Reflector, KSAR) remains the largest telescope operated by the U.S. Navy. Congress appropriated funding in 1961 and it saw first light in 1964. This status will change when the NPOI four 1.8-meter telescopes see their own first light in the near future. KSAR rides in the arms of an equatorial fork mount. The telescope is used in both the visible spectrum, and in the near infrared (NIR), the latter using a sub-30-kelvin, helium-refrigerated, InSb (Indium antimonide) camera, "Astrocam". In 1978, the 1.55-m telescope was used to "discover the moon of dwarf planet Pluto, named 'Charon'". (Pluto itself was discovered in 1930, across town at Lowell Observatory). The Charon discovery led to mass calculations which ultimately revealed how tiny Pluto was, and eventually caused the IAU to reclassify Pluto as a dwarf (not a principal) planet. The 1.55-meter telescope was also used to observe and track NASA's Deep Impact Spacecraft, as it navigated to a successful inter-planetary impact with the celebrated Comet 9p/Tempel, in 2005. This telescope is particularly well-suited to perform stellar parallax studies, narrow-field astrometry supporting space navigation, and has also played a key role in discovering one of the coolest-ever known brown dwarf objects, in 2002. The KSAR dome is centrally located on NOFS grounds, with support and office buildings attached to the dome structures. The large vacuum coating chamber facility is also located in this complex. The chamber can provide very accurate coatings and overcoatings of 100±2 Angstrom thickness (approximately 56 aluminium atoms thick), for small-to-multi-ton optics up to 1.8-meter (72-inch) in diameter, in a vacuum exceeding 7×10^{6} Torr, using a vertical-optic, 1500-ampere discharge system. A dielectric coating capability has also been demonstrated. Large optics and telescope components can be moved about NOFS using its suite of cranes, lifts, cargo elevators and specialized carts. The main complex also contains a controlled-environment, optical and electronics lab for laser, adaptive optics, optics development, collimation, mechanical, and micro-electronic control systems needed for NOFS and NPOI.

The KSAR Telescope's 18-meter (60-foot) diameter steel dome is quite large for the telescope's aperture, owing to its telescope's long f/9.8 focal ratio (favorable for very accurate optical collimation, or alignment, needed for astrometric observation). It uses a very wide 2-shutter, vertical slit. Development studies have taken place to successfully show that planned life-cycle replacement of this venerable instrument can be efficiently done within the original dome, for a future telescope with an aperture of up to 3.6-meter (140-inch), by using fast, modern-day optics. However, the 61-inch telescope remains unique in its ability to operationally conduct both very high-accuracy relative astrometry to the milliarcsecond level, and close-separation, PSF photometry. Several key programs take advantage of this capability to this day.

=== 1.3-m telescope ===
The 1.3-meter (51-inch) large-field Ritchey–Chrétien telescope was produced by DFM Engineering and then corrected and automated by NOFS staff. Corning Glass Works and Kodak made the primary mirror. The hyperbolic secondary has an advanced, computer-controlled collimation (alignment) system in order to permit very precise positions of stars and satellites (milliarcsecond astrometry) across its wide field of view. This system analyzes optical aberrations of the optical path, modeled by taking slope fits of the wavefront deviations revealed using a Hartmann mask. The telescope also now sports a state-of-the art, cryogenic wide-field mosaic CCD camera. It will also permit employment of the new "Microcam", an orthogonal transfer array (OTA), with Pan-STARRS heritage. Other advanced camera systems are also deployed for use on this telescope, such as the LANL-produced RULLI single photon counter, nCam. Using the telescope's special software controls, the telescope can track both stars and artificial satellites orbiting the Earth, while the camera images both. The 1.3 m dome itself is compact, owing to the fast overall optics at f/4. It is located near by and southwest of, the very large 61-inch dome. In addition to astrometric studies (such as for Space Situational Awareness, SDSS and SST), research on this telescope includes the study of blue and K-Giant stars, celestial mechanics and dynamics of multiple star systems, characterizations of artificial satellites, and the astrometry and transit photometry of exoplanets.

=== 1.0-m telescope ===
The 1.0-meter (40-inch) "Ritchey–Chrétien Telescope" is also an equatorially driven, fork-mounted telescope. The Ritchey is the original Station telescope which was moved from USNO in Washington in 1955. It is also the first R-C telescope ever made from that famous optical prescription, and was coincidentally the last telescope built by George Ritchey himself. The telescope is still in operation after a half century of astronomy at NOFS. It performs key quasar-based reference frame operations (International Celestial Reference Frame), transit detections of exoplanets, Vilnius photometry, M-Dwarf star analysis, dynamical system analysis, reference support to orbiting space object information, horizontal parallax guide support to NPOI, and it performs photometric operations support to astrometric studies (along with its newer siblings). The 40-inch telescope can carry a number of liquid nitrogen-cooled cameras, a coronagraph, and a nine-stellar magnitude neutral density spot focal plane array camera, through which star positions are cross-checked before use in fundamental NPOI reference frame astrometry.

This telescope is also used to test internally developed optical adaptive optics (AO) systems, using tip-tilt and deformable mirror optics. The Shack–Hartmann AO system allows for corrections of the wavefront's aberrations caused by scintillation (degraded seeing), to higher Zernike polynomials. AO systems at NOFS will migrate to the 1.55-m and 1.8-m telescopes for future incorporation there.

The 40-inch dome is located at the summit and highest point of the mountain upon which NOFS is located. It is adjacent to a comprehensive instrumentation shop, which includes CAD-driven CNC fabrication machinery, and an array of design and support tooling.

=== 0.2-m FASTT ===
A modern-day example of a fully robotic transit telescope is the small 0.20-meter (8-inch) Flagstaff Astrometric Scanning Transit Telescope (FASTT) completed in 1981 and located at the observatory. FASTT provides extremely precise positions of solar system objects for incorporation into the USNO Astronomical Almanac and Nautical Almanac. These ephemerides are also used by NASA in the deep space navigation of its planetary and extra-orbital spacecraft. Instrumental to the navigation of many NASA deep space probes, data from this telescope is responsible for NASA JPL's successful 2005 navigation-to-landing of the Huygens Lander on Titan, a major moon orbiting Saturn, and provided navigational reference for NASA's New Horizons deep space mission to Pluto, which arrived in July 2015. FASTT was also used to help NASA's SOFIA Airborne Observatory correctly locate, track and image a rare Pluto occultation. FASTT is located 150 yards (140 meters) southwest of the primary complex. Attached to its large "hut" is the building housing NOFS' electronics and electrical engineering laboratories and clean rooms, where most of the advanced camera electronics, cryogenics and telescope control drives are developed and made.

== Navy Precision Optical Interferometer ==
NOFS operates the Navy Precision Optical Interferometer (NPOI) in collaboration with Lowell Observatory and the Naval Research Laboratory at Anderson Mesa, 15 miles (24 km) south-east of Flagstaff. NOFS (the operational astrometric arm of USNO) funds all principle operations, and from this contracts Lowell Observatory to maintain the Anderson Mesa facility and make the observations necessary for NOFS to conduct the primary astrometric science. The Naval Research Laboratory (NRL) also provides additional funds to contract Lowell Observatory's and NRL's implementation of additional, long-baseline siderostat stations, facilitating NRL's primary scientific work, synthetic imaging (both celestial and of orbital satellites). The three institutions – USNO, NRL, and Lowell – each provide an executive to sit on an Operational Advisory Panel (OAP), which collectively guides the science and operations of the interferometer. The OAP commissioned the chief scientist and director of the NPOI to effect the science and operations for the Panel; this manager is a senior member of the NOFS staff and reports to the NOFS Director.

NPOI is an astronomical interferometer of the Michelson interferometer design. The majority of interferometric science and operations are funded and managed by NOFS; however, Lowell Observatory and NRL join in the scientific efforts through their fractions of time to use the interferometer: 85% Navy (NOFS and NRL) and 15% Lowell. NPOI is one of the few major instruments globally which can conduct optical interferometry (see an illustration of its layout, at bottom). NOFS has used NPOI to conduct a wide and diverse series of scientific studies, beyond just the study of absolute astrometric positions of stars. Additional NOFS science at NPOI includes the study of binary stars, Be stars, oblate stars, rapidly rotating stars, those with starspots, and the imaging of stellar disks (the first in history) and flare stars. In 2007–2008, NRL with NOFS used NPOI to obtain first-ever closure phase image precursors of satellites orbiting in geostationary orbit.

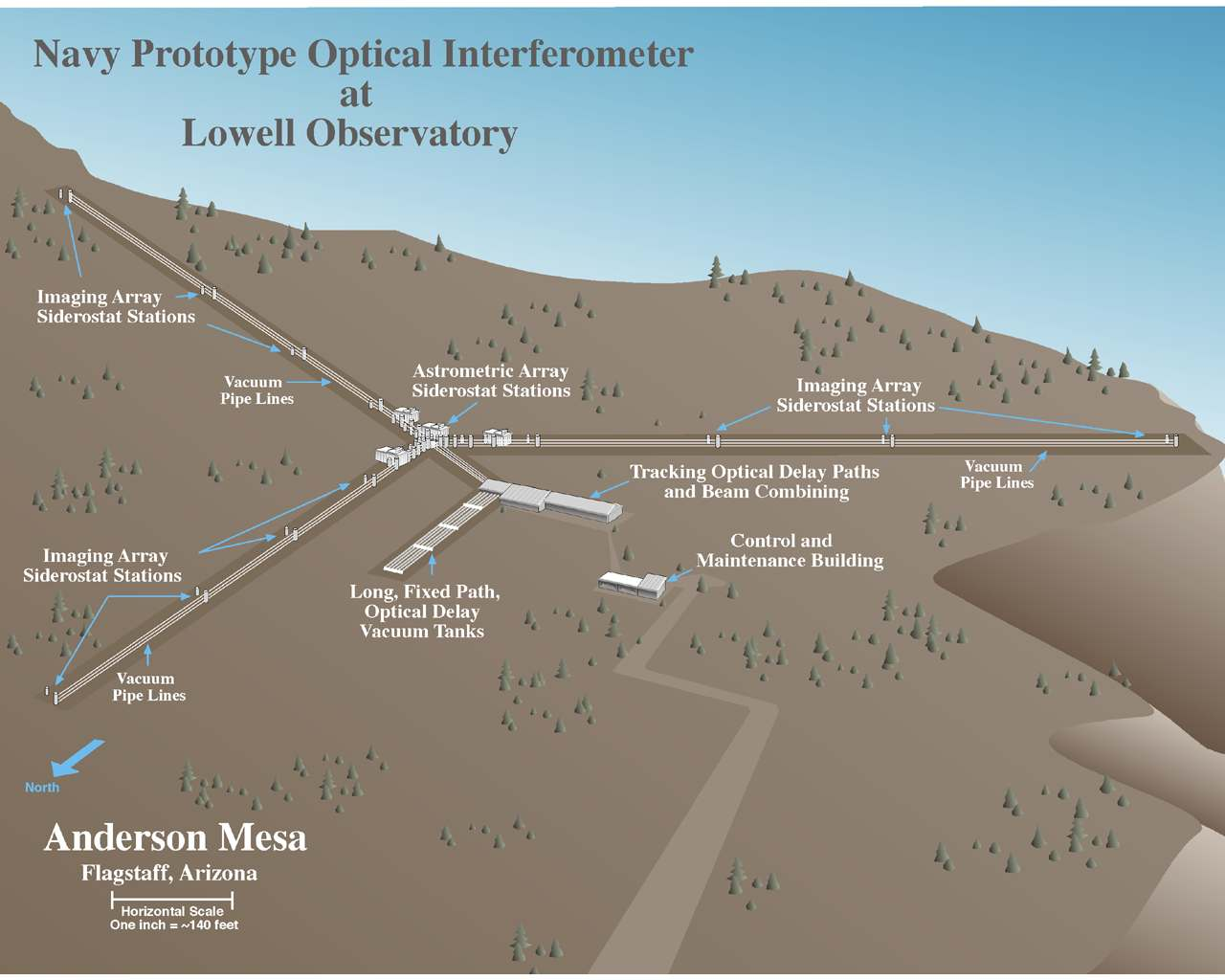
Navy Precision Optical Interferometer (NPOI) Layout

== Gallery ==
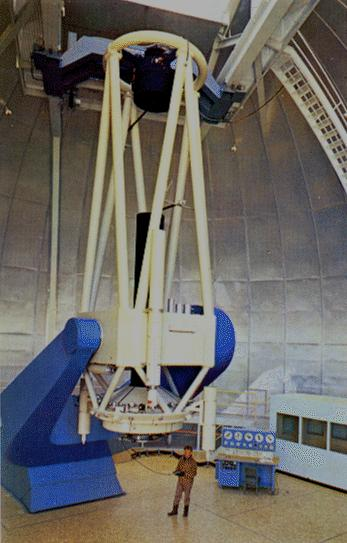
The Kaj Strand 1.55-m

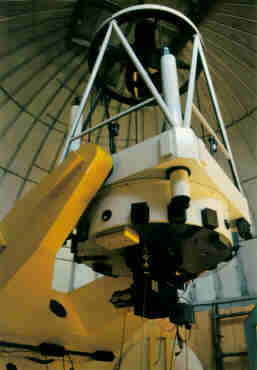
The wide field 1.3-m

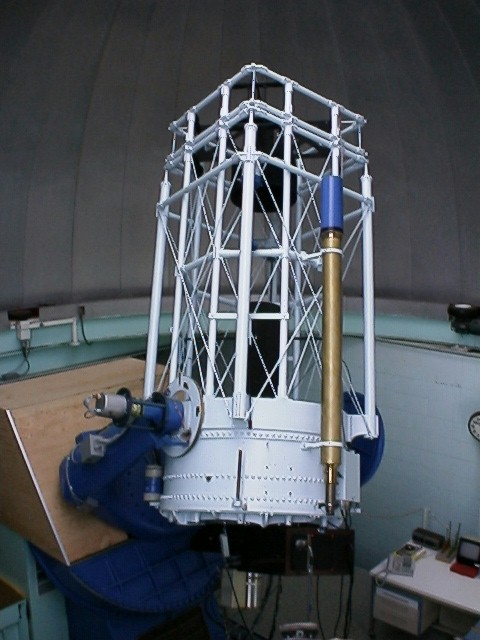
The 40-inch Ritchey

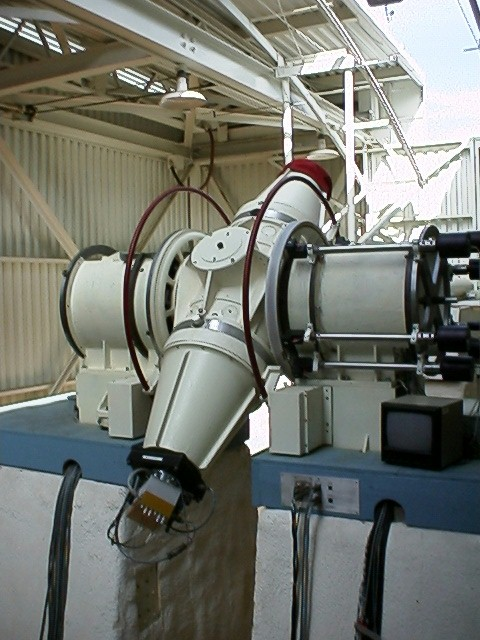
The Ron Stone FASTT

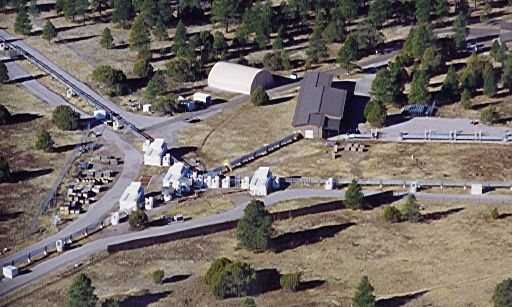
The NPOI

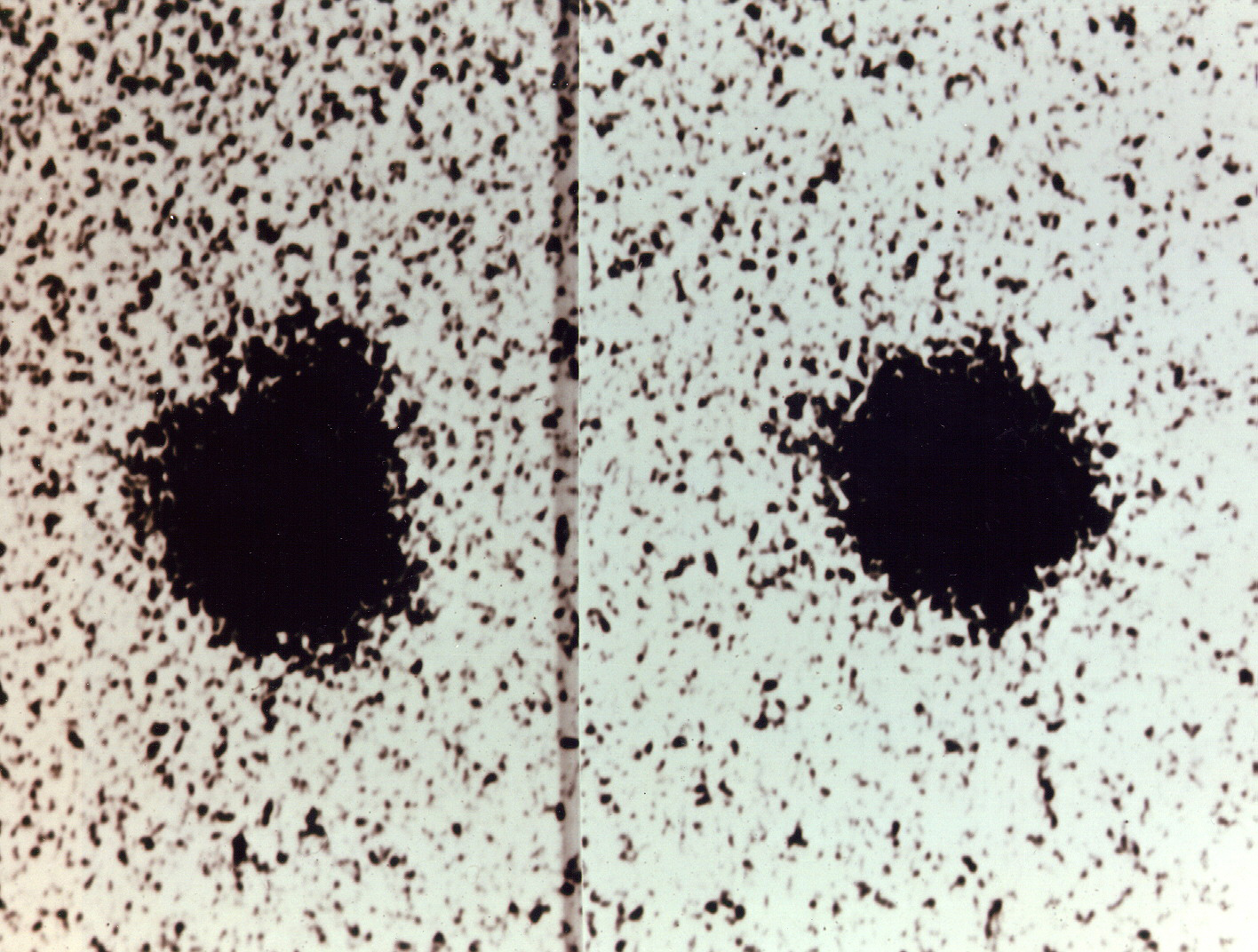
The 1.55-meter discovery images of Pluto's main moon, Charon

== See also ==
- List of astronomical observatories
