= Anderson Mesa =

Landform in Coconino County, Arizona

- Location within Arizona

Highest point
- Elevation: 7,211 ft (2,198 m) NAVD 88
- Coordinates: 35°08′27″N 111°30′45″W

Geography
- Location: Coconino County, Arizona, US

Geology
- Mountain type: Mesa

Anderson Mesa (Navajo: Hosh Dikʼání) is approximately five miles long, located 20 miles southeast of Flagstaff, Arizona, United States, east of Lake Mary and north of Mormon Lake, in Coconino County.

This mesa landform, with an elevation between 6,200 and 7,200 feet (1,900 and 2,200 m), has been the site of Lowell Observatory's Anderson Mesa Station since 1959. Because it is also very flat, it is also home to the Naval Observatory's Navy Precision Optical Interferometer, or "NPOI", since 1992.

It is also the inspiration for the 1996 Jimmy Eat World song of the same title.

== See also ==
- Table (landform)
