= Infrared Optical Telescope Array =

Former observatory in Santa Cruz County, Arizona

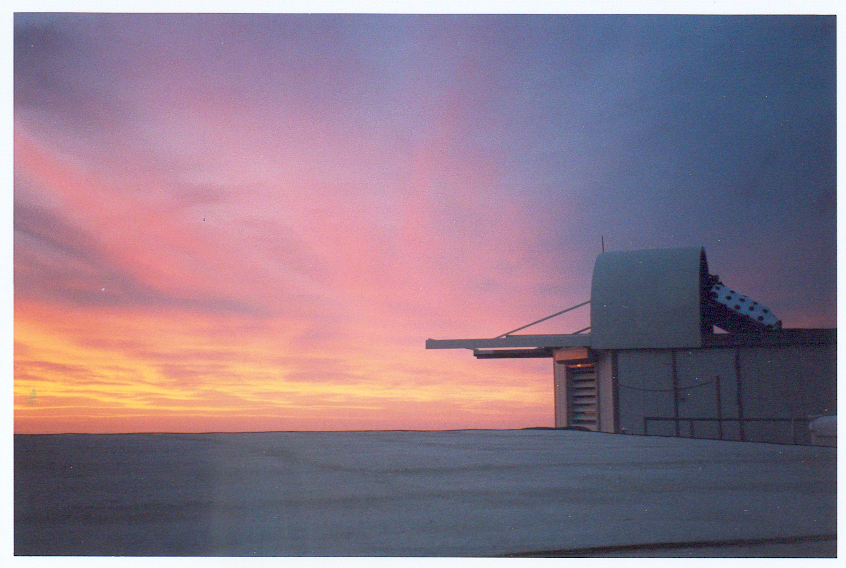
- Infrared Optical Telescope Array instrument cupola at sunset
- Location(s): Santa Cruz County, Arizona
- Coordinates: 31°41′29″N 110°53′06″W
- Decommissioned: February 2007
- Website: tdc-www.harvard.edu/IOTA/
- Location of Infrared Optical Telescope Array
- Related media on Commons

The Infrared Optical Telescope Array (IOTA) was a stellar interferometer array. IOTA began with an agreement in 1988 among five Institutions, the Smithsonian Astrophysical Observatory, Harvard University, the University of Massachusetts Amherst, the University of Wyoming, and MIT/Lincoln Laboratory, to build a two-telescope stellar interferometer for the purpose of making fundamental astrophysical observations, and also as a prototype instrument on which they could perfect techniques which could later lead to the development of a larger, more powerful array. On site construction went on for all 1993 and 1994, with first fringes in December 1993. It is located at Fred Lawrence Whipple Observatory.

In 2000 the third telescope came online providing closure phase observations, allowing aperture synthesis imaging to be performed for the first time at IOTA. The array was decommissioned and disassembled in summer 2006 due to lack of funding.

== See also ==
- List of astronomical interferometers at visible and infrared wavelengths
