= CHARA array =

Optical interferometer on Mount Wilson, California

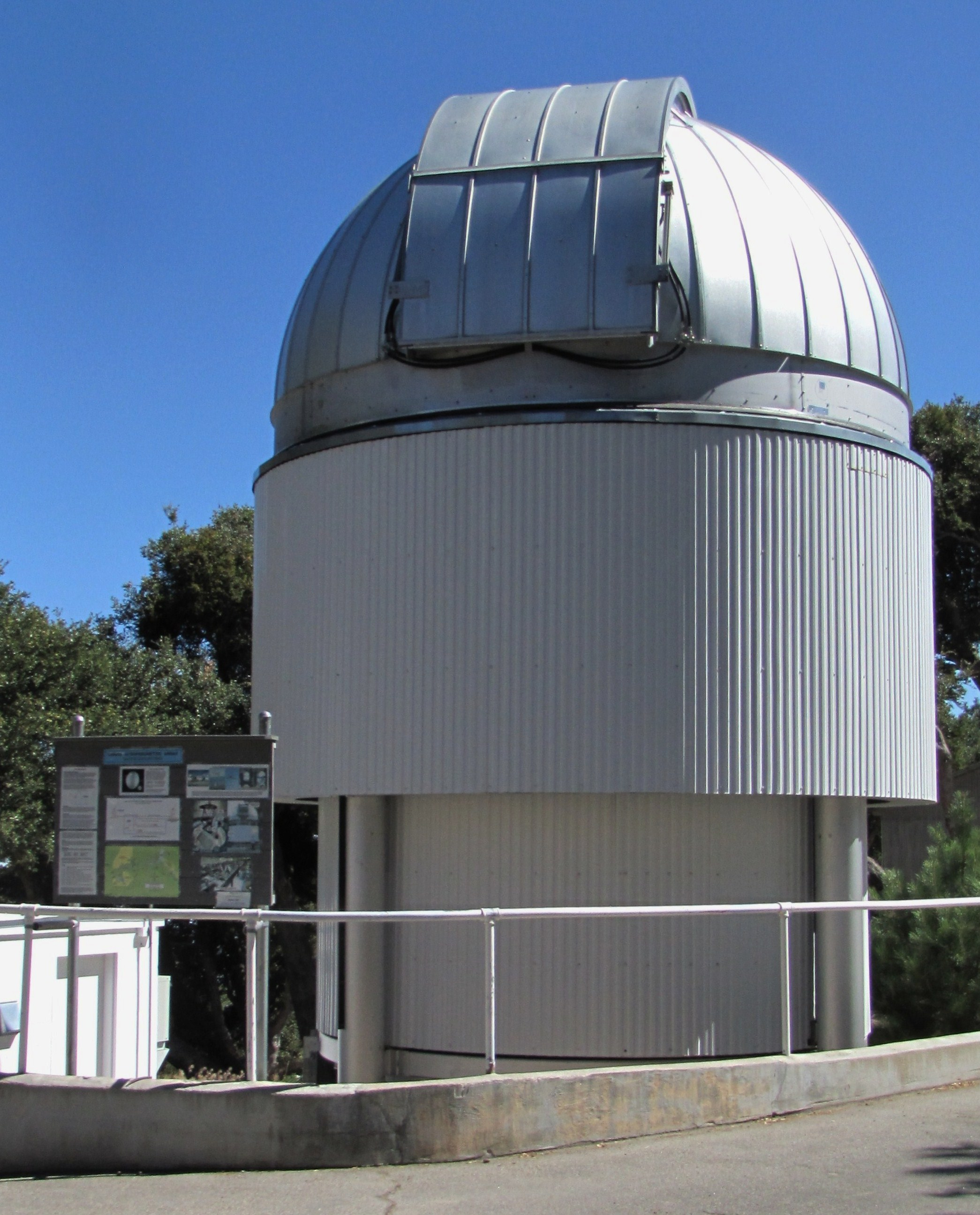
- Alternative names: Center for High Angular Resolution Astronomy
- Location(s): California, Pacific States Region
- Coordinates: 34°13′29″N 118°03′26″W
- Website: www.chara.gsu.edu
- Location of CHARA array
- Related media on Commons

The CHARA (Center for High Angular Resolution Astronomy) array is an optical interferometer, located on Mount Wilson, California. The array consists of six 1-metre (40 in) telescopes operating as an astronomical interferometer. Construction was completed in 2003. CHARA is owned by Georgia State University (GSU).

== Functionality ==
CHARA's six telescopes each have a one-meter-diameter mirror to reflect light. They are spread across Mount Wilson to increase the angular resolution of the array. Each of the six telescopes provides a different image; to combine it into one image, the light from each telescope is transported through vacuum tubes and fed into a single beam, where they are matched up to within one micron. This process is called interferometry, and allows the array to have the same resolving power as a telescope with a 330-meter mirror, and an angular resolution of 200 micro-arcseconds. In 2024, a 7th telescope was added to the array. This is a mobile telescope which can extend the resolving power of the array up to that of a telescope with approximately 600-meter mirror.

== History ==
CHARA was founded in 1984, and with financial support from the National Science Foundation (NSF), planning for the array began in 1985. Construction for the array started on July 13, 1996, and with $6.3 million awarded to Georgia State University by the NSF, and the same amount matched by GSU, going towards the effort. In July 1998, GSU was awarded another $1.5 million by the W. M. Keck Foundation, which allowed for a sixth telescope to be added to the previously planned five. With a final gift of $574,000 from David and Lucile Packard Foundation, the funding for the array was completed in October 1998.

After another five years of construction, the CHARA array was completed in 2003. In April of that year, CHARA was awarded a 3-year grant to support scientific programs at the center, which was renewed in 2006. In 2013, another grant from the NSF worth $3.6 million was given to the center.

Observatories throughout the world have come to CHARA to test beam-combining technology.

== Discoveries ==
On January 15, 2007, the diameter of an exoplanet, HD 189733 b, was measured directly, using CHARA. This was achieved by using the observed angular diameter of the star that the planet orbited, and the already known distance of the star from Earth, to get the diameter of the star. With this they could calculate the diameter of the exoplanet when comparing its size to the star when it passed in front of it. This was the first time the diameter of an exoplanet was directly measured, and returned a value slightly different than that obtained from indirect, more conventional methods.

In 2013, CHARA was used to capture images showing the starspots on Zeta Andromedae, a star 181 light-years away. This was the first time that images of starspots on stars other than the Sun were taken.

CHARA has directly observed binary stars, such as Beta Lyrae and Algol. CHARA directly imaged multiple stars, such as Regulus, Rasalhague, Altair, Alderamin and Beta Cassiopeiae to measure the flattened shape of these rapidly rotating stars. Because the equator is further from the center of the star, it will appear cooler than the poles, an effect called gravity darkening.

The CHARA array can also resolve the circumstellar disks around Be-stars and measure the disk precession variations.

In 2022, the array was used to observe the disc of the hypergiant star RW Cephei during its ongoing dimming event.

== Events ==
CHARA holds annual science meetings where recent advancements in science and technologies relevant to the array are discussed. The center also gives access to the array to the astronomical community using the National Optical Astronomy Observatory peer-review system for around 50 nights per year. They also have periodic community workshops.

== Gallery ==
Stars imaged by CHARA array
Algol A and B system

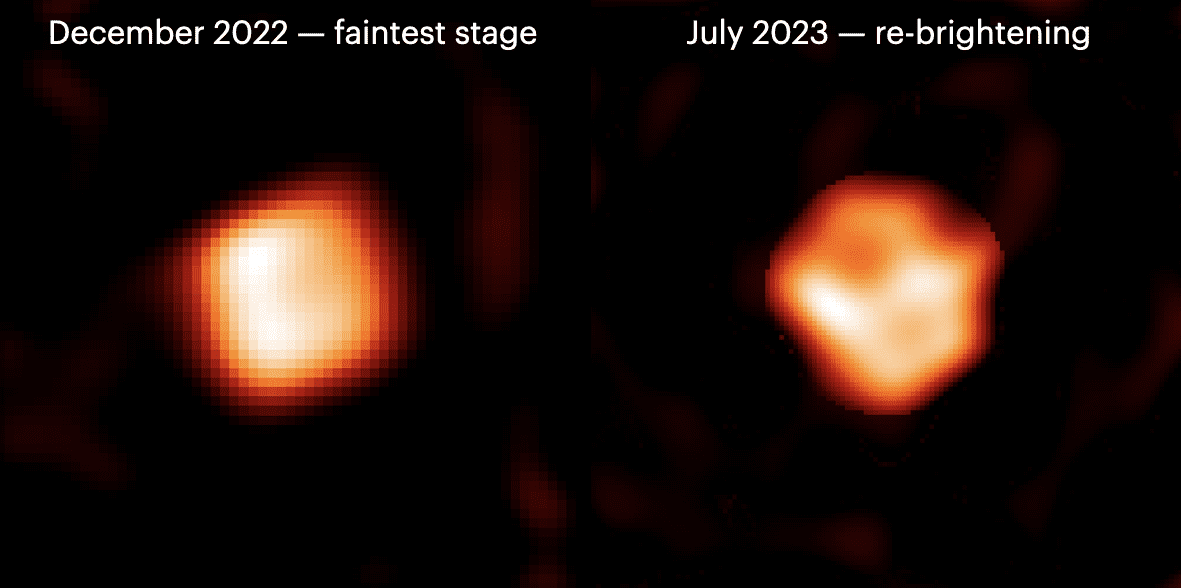
RW Cephei dimming and rebrightening

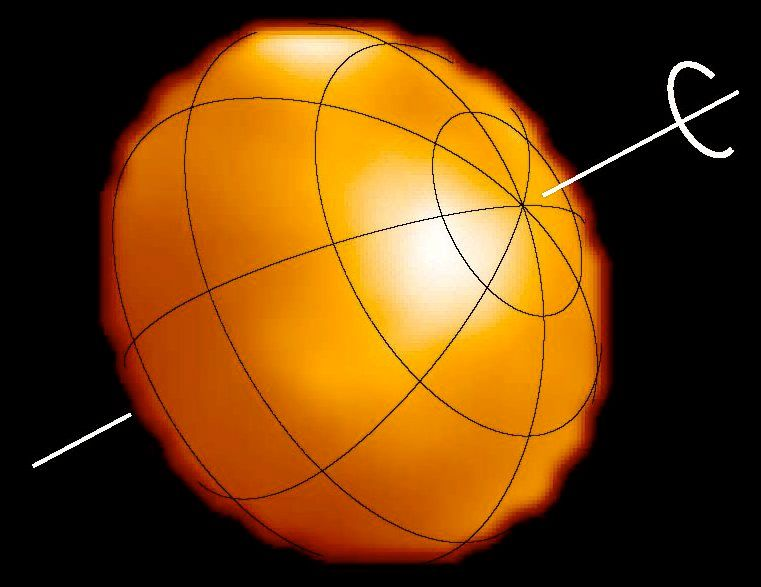
Altair with rotation axis illustrated

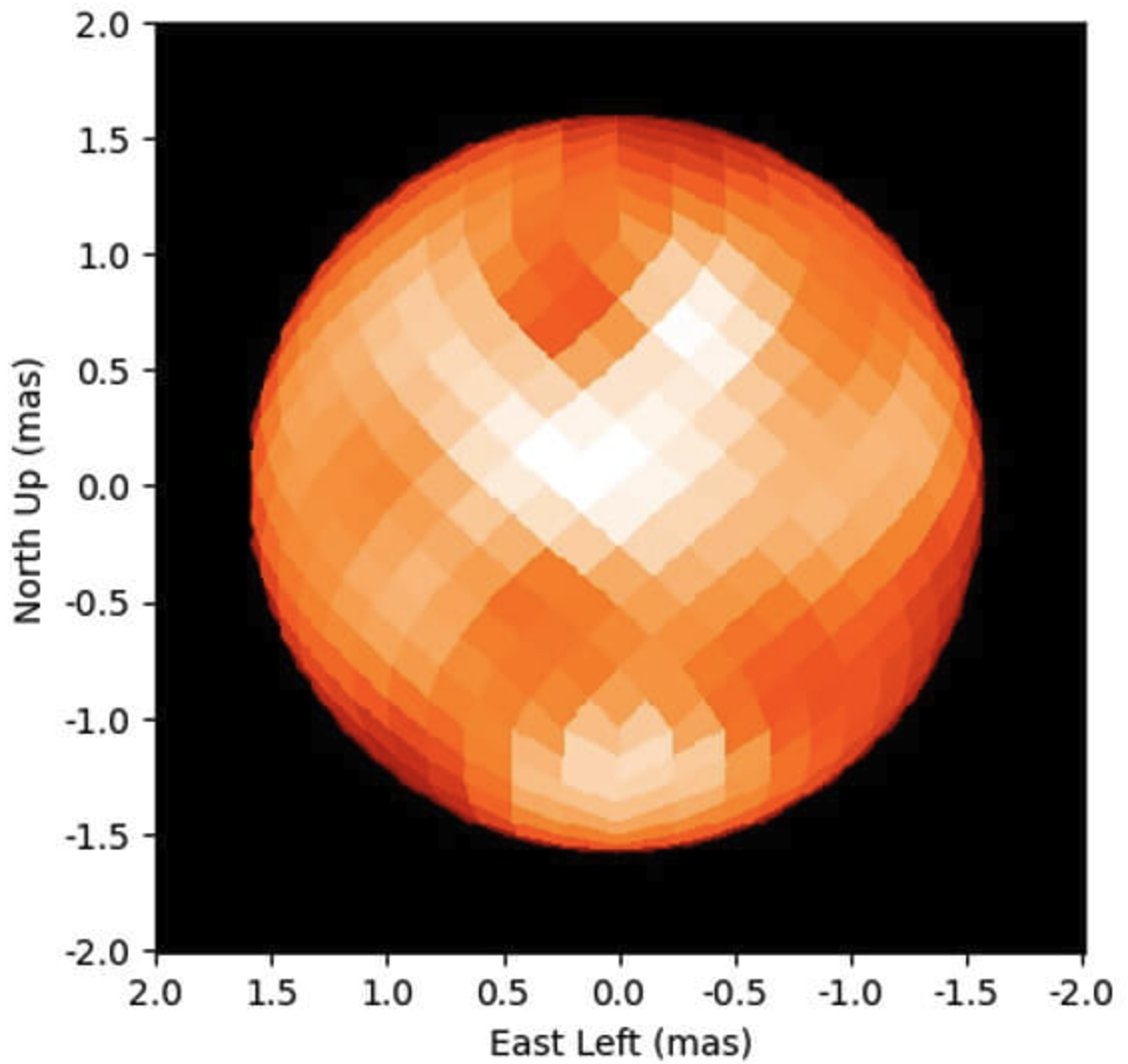
Polaris surface image

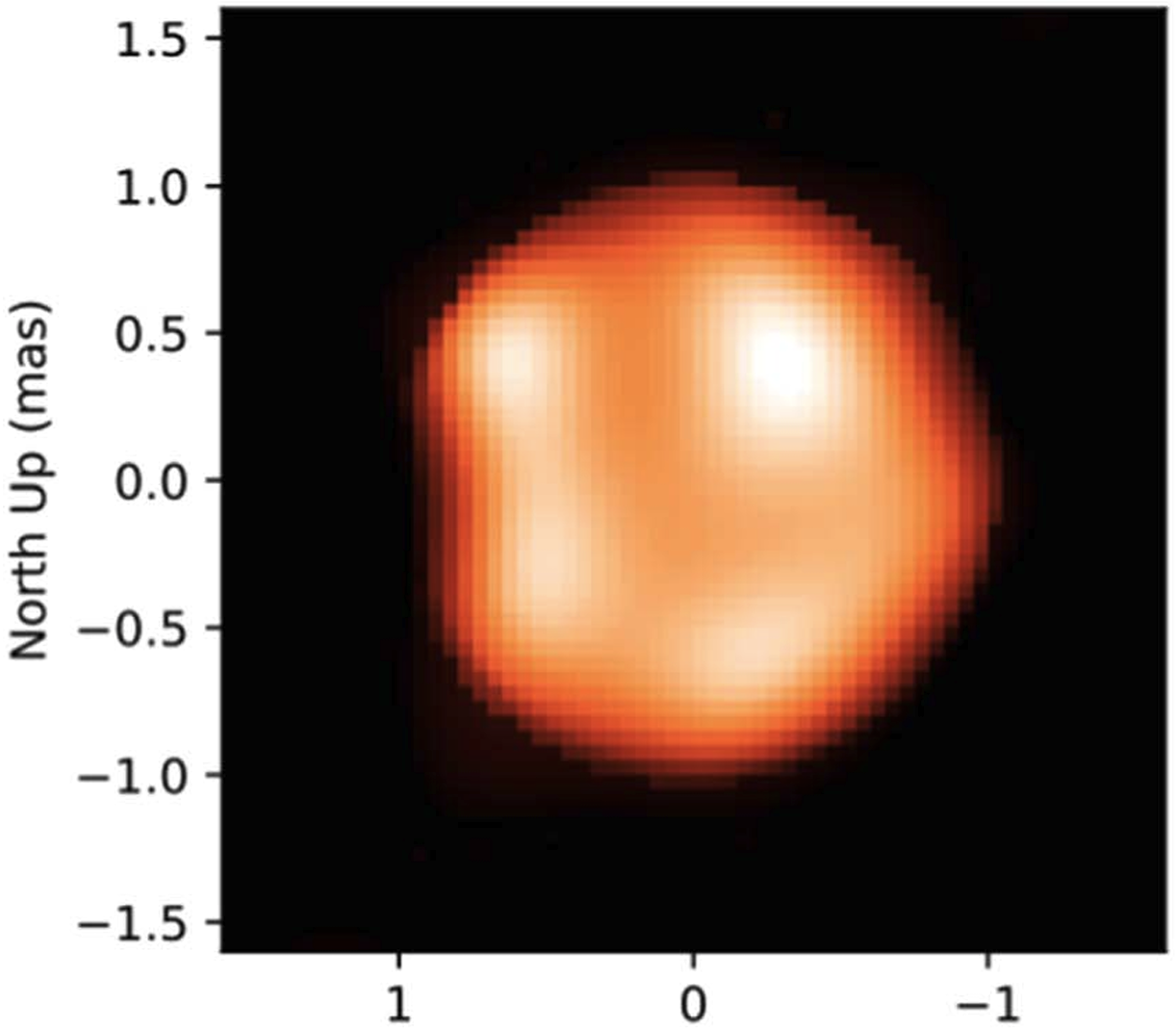
Rho Cassiopeiae

== See also ==
- Interferometry
- Mount Wilson
- List of astronomical interferometers at visible and infrared wavelengths
