= Magdalena Ridge Observatory =

American astronomical observatory

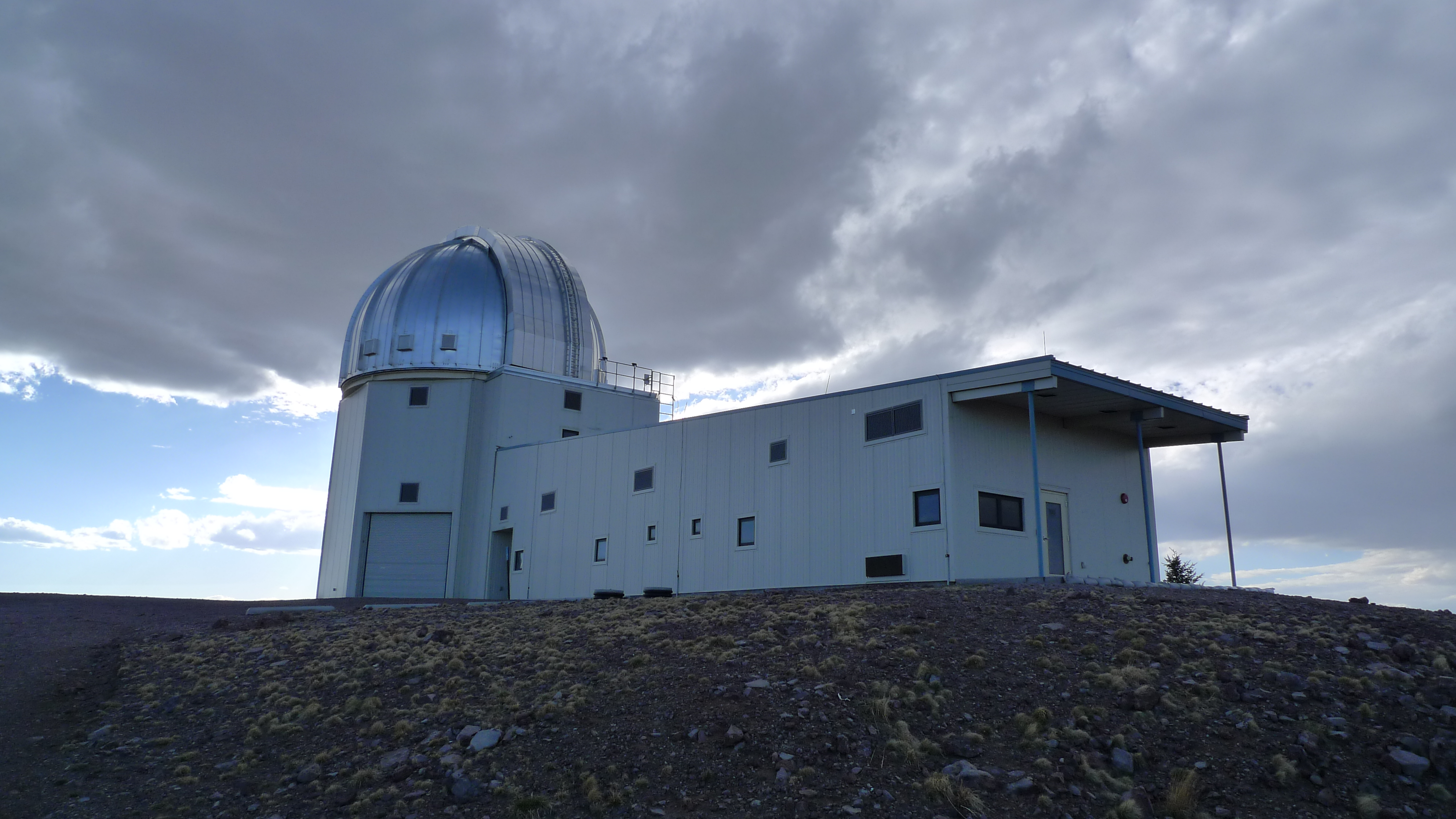
- 2.4-meter Telescope at Magdalena Ridge
- Organization: New Mexico Institute of Mining and Technology
- Observatory code: H01
- Location: Socorro County, New Mexico, US
- Coordinates: 33°58′36″N 107°11′06″W
- Altitude: 3,230 m (10,600 ft)
- Established: 1999
- Website: www.mro.nmt.edu
- Telescopes: MRO Optical Interferometer; MRO fast-tracking Telescope
- Related media on Commons

The Magdalena Ridge Observatory (MRO) is an astronomical observatory in Socorro County, New Mexico, about 32 kilometers (20 mi) west of the town of Socorro. The observatory is located in the Magdalena Mountains near the summit of South Baldy Mountain, adjacent to the Langmuir Laboratory for Atmospheric Research. The site currently hosts three astronomical facilities:

- A 2.4-meter fast-tracking optical telescope has been operational at the site since 2008.
- A ten-element optical interferometer that is under construction as an international scientific collaboration between New Mexico Institute of Mining and Technology (New Mexico Tech – NMT) and the Cavendish Astrophysics Group of University of Cambridge. As of 2025, two of the ten telescopes have been installed and verified on-sky.
- A collection of robotic telescopes for time-domain astronomy, managed by researchers at the University of Minnesota.

== Telescopes ==
=== 2.4-meter telescope ===
The MRO 2.4-meter (7.9 ft) telescope is a Nasmyth design on an azimuth-elevation (az-el) mount. The telescope is capable of slew rates of 10 degrees per second, enabling it to observe artificial objects in low Earth orbit. The telescope is also used for asteroid studies and observations of other Solar System objects. The MRO 2.4-meter achieved first light on October 31, 2006, and began regular operations on September 1, 2008, after a commissioning phase that included tracking near-Earth asteroid 2007 WD_{5} for NASA.

The telescope's primary mirror has a complicated history. It was built by Itek as part of a competition for the contract for the Hubble mirror (although it has a different prescription than the one used to construct the Hubble). When Perkin-Elmer was chosen instead as the Hubble contractor, the mirror was passed to a classified Air Force project. When this project was in turn discontinued, the mirror was transferred to the Magdalena Ridge Observatory, along with a blank for the secondary.

As of May 2008, the facility is under a multi-year contract with NASA to provide follow-up astrometry and characterization data on near-Earth asteroids and comets as part of Spaceguard, and also collaborates with the Air Force to track and characterize satellites in GEO and LEO orbits. On October 9, 2009, New Mexico Tech scientists used instruments on the MRO 2.4-meter and at the Etscorn Campus Observatory to observe controlled impacts of two NASA Centaur rockets at the southern polar region of the moon as part of the LCROSS Project.

On October 23, 2015, it was announced that the MRO telescope will receive funding from the Federal Aviation Administration (FAA) in early 2016 to monitor the launch and re-entry of commercial space vehicles from Spaceport America.

=== Magdalena Ridge Observatory Interferometer ===
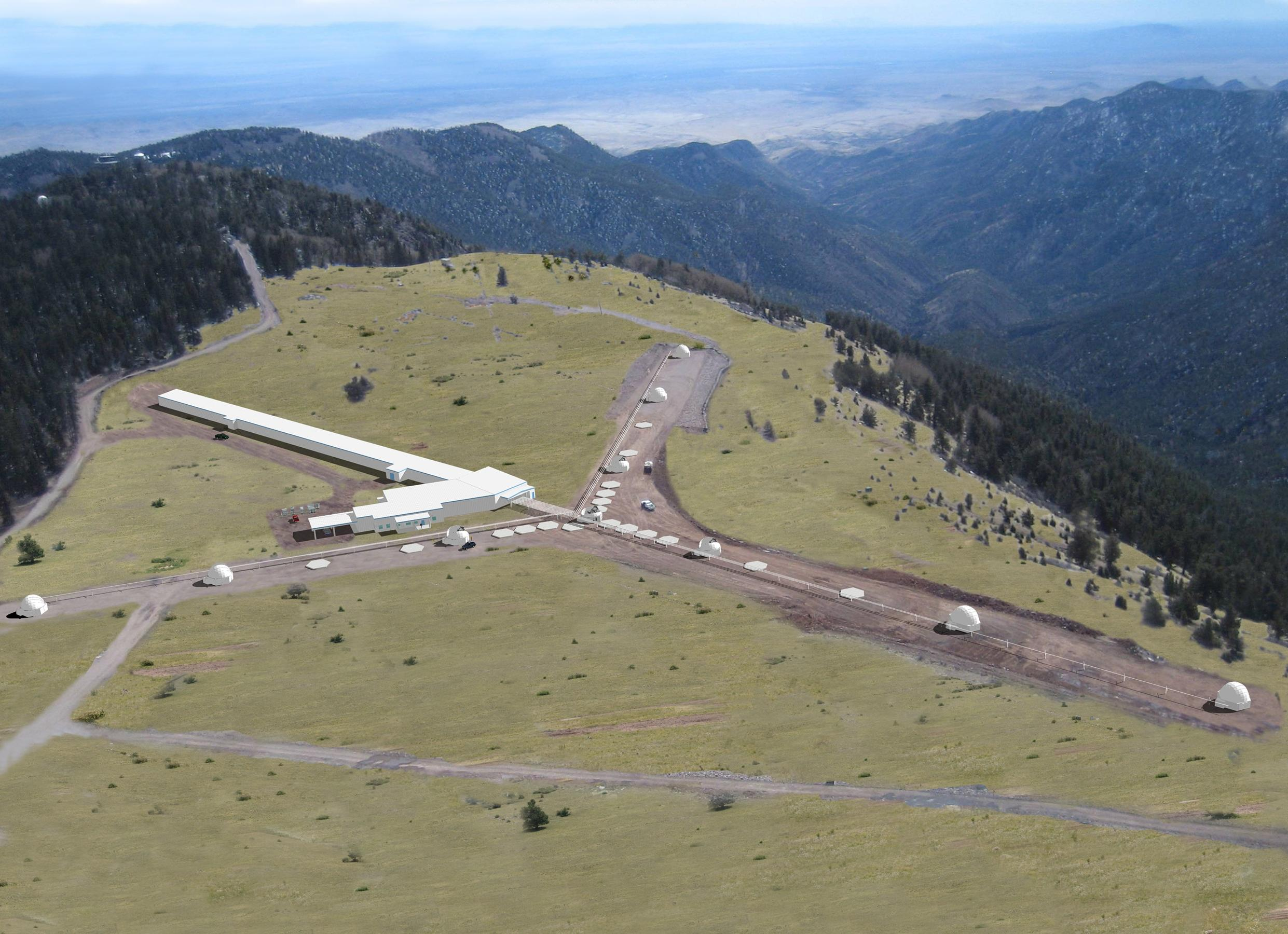
Artist's conception of the MROI array

The Magdalena Ridge Observatory Interferometer (MROI) is an optical and near infrared interferometer under construction at MRO. When the MROI is completed, it will have ten 1.4 m (55 in) telescopes located on three 340 m (1,120 ft) arms. Each arm will have nine stations where the telescopes can be positioned, and one telescope can be positioned at the center. The telescopes and their enclosures will be moved with a customized crane. Light from the telescopes' primary mirrors will be directed along the arms to the Beam Combining Facility (BCF). These pipes will be evacuated of all air in order to reduce distortions. Inside the BCF, the light will first travel through extensions of the pipes in the Delay Line Area, which will bring the light beams into phase. Then light will exit the vacuum pipes in the Beam Combining Area (BCA), where the light will be directed into one of three permanent sensors, or to a temporary instrument on a fourth table. The light will strike a total of eleven mirrors before entering a sensor.

The MROI was designed with three research areas in mind: star and planet formation, stellar accretion and mass loss, and active galactic nuclei. An interferometer was selected because such devices can be built with higher resolving power than single-mirror telescopes, enabling them to image distant objects in greater detail. However, they do not provide more light-gathering capacity, as the total area of the mirrors is usually small.

The project is principally funded by the Air Force Research Laboratory (AFRL). Previously, it was funded by the United States Naval Research Laboratory (NRL), which also supports the Navy Optical Interferometer near Flagstaff, Arizona. NRL is part of the Office of Naval Research. New Mexico State University, New Mexico Highlands University, the University of Puerto Rico, and Los Alamos National Laboratory were originally partners, but have since withdrawn.

==== MROI construction status ====
The basic design of MROI was completed in 2006. Construction of the facility began in August 2006 with the BCF building, which was completed in 2008. In July 2007, the contract for the design of the ten 1.4 m telescopes was awarded to Advanced Mechanical and Optical Systems S.A. (AMOS) of Belgium. In 2009 the design of the infrastructure of interferometer arms was completed, as was the design for the telescope enclosures. In 2010 construction of the arms began. Also in 2010 the first delay line was installed in the BCF.

In October 2015, New Mexico Tech signed a five-year, $25 million cooperative agreement with AFRL to support continued development of the interferometer at the observatory. Dr. Van Romero, Vice President of Research at Tech, said the new funding will allow the completion of three telescopes, mounts and enclosures on the mountaintop facility. The first telescope was installed in 2016, but construction was paused in 2019 when the AFRL funding was withdrawn by US Congress.

Construction resumed in 2021 under a new five-year cooperative agreement with AFRL. By 2025, the second telescope had been installed on the array and two full beamlines were in place to receive near-infrared light on a beam combining instrument. Interference fringes were recorded for the first time in the early hours of July 12, 2025 using the bright star Epsilon Cygni.

=== New Mexico Exoplanet Spectroscopic Survey Instrument ===
The New Mexico Exoplanet Spectroscopic Survey Instrument (NESSI) is a ground-based instrument specifically designed to study the atmospheres of exoplanets. The $3.5 million instrument is the first purpose-built device for the analysis of exoplanet atmospheres, and is expected to have a powerful impact on the field of exoplanet characterization.

The Principal Investigator is Michele Creech-Eakman at the New Mexico Institute of Mining and Technology, working with seven co-investigators. The NESSI instrument was mounted on the observatory's 2.4 meter telescope. The instrument's first exoplanet observations began in April 2014.

=== TURBO ===
The Total-Coverage Ultra-Fast Response to Binary-Mergers Observatory (TURBO) is a set of fast-slewing robotic telescopes for time-domain astronomy located at MRO and at Skinakas Observatory in Greece.

=== COSMO ===
The Coronal Solar Magnetism Observatory (COSMO) is a proposed solar telescope that is in the site selection stage. The MRO site was included on the final shortlist of three proposed locations, the others being at Cerro Tololo Inter-American Observatory and Teide Observatory. A campaign is in progress to assess the atmospheric conditions that can affect the clarity of coronal observations.

== See also ==
- List of astronomical interferometers at visible and infrared wavelengths
- List of astronomical observatories
- Very Large Array — nearby radio Interferometer observatory
