= List of astronomical interferometers at visible and infrared wavelengths =

Here is a list of currently existing astronomical optical interferometers (i.e. operating from visible to mid-infrared wavelengths), and some parameters describing their performance.

== Current performance of ground-based interferometers ==
Columns 2-5 determine the range of targets that can be observed and the range of science which can be done. Higher limiting magnitude means that the array can observe fainter sources. The limiting magnitude is determined by the atmospheric seeing, the diameters of the telescopes and the light lost in the system. A larger range of baselines means that a wider variety of science can be done and on a wider range of sources.

Columns 6-10 indicate the approximate quality and total amount of science data the array is expected to obtain. This is per year, to account for the average number of cloud-free nights on which each array is operated.

Current Performance of Existing Astronomical Interferometers
Interferometer and observing mode	Waveband	Limiting magnitude	Minimum baseline (m) (un-projected)	Maximum baseline (m)	Approx. no. visibility measurements per year (measurements per night x nights used per year)	Max ratio of no. phase / no. amplitude measurements (measure of imaging performance, 0 = none)	Accuracy of amplitude^{2} measurements	Accuracy of phase measurements (milli-radians)	Number of spectral channels (max in use simultaneously)	Operational?	Comments
CHARA Array	V, R, I, J, H, K	8	34	330	7500	0.7	1%	10	30000	Yes	30000 in the visible band; maximum baseline 330-m
COAST visible	R, I	7	4	60	2000	0.5	4%	10	4?	Closed	300 cloudy nights per year, maximum baseline 100-m
COAST infrared	J, H	3	4	60	100	0.5	20%	10	1	Closed	300 cloudy nights per year, maximum baseline 100-m
GI2T visible	R, I	5	10	65	2000	0	10%	-	400?	Closed	CLOSED in 2006
IOTA	J, H, K, L'	7	6	30	10000	0.3	2%	10	1?	Closed	Integrated optics beam combiner. CLOSED.
ISI	N	0	10	50	5000	0.3	1%	1	1000	Closed	Maximum baseline 70-m
Keck Interferometer	H, K, L, N	10.3	85	85	1000	0	4%	1	330	Closed	Nulling Key Science Underway - No imaging on a single baseline instrument; maximum baseline 11-m. CLOSED.
Keck Aperture Masking	J, H, K, L	2	0.5	9	20000	0.9	20%	10	1		CLOSED.
MIRA 1.2	R, I	3	30	30	500	0	10%	-	1	Closed	Mid-Infrared
Navy Precision Optical Interferometer(NPOI)	V, R, I	6	5	97 (operational) 432 (not yet commissioned)	50000	0.7	4%	10	16	Yes	at Lowell Observatory 12cm siderostats operational 3 x 1.0m apertures being added World's largest optical baseline-437m 6-phased
Palomar Testbed Interferometer	J,H,K	7	86	110	50000	0	2%	0.1	5,10	Closed	"dual-star" capable , No imaging on a single baseline instrument. CLOSED 2009.
SUSI	B, V, R, I	5	5	160 (operated) 640 (never commissioned)	5000	0	4%	10	21	Closed	No imaging on a single baseline instrument; Maximum baseline 160m
VLTI +UTs AMBER	J, H, K simultaneously	7	46	130	400	0.3	1%	10	2000	Yes	Used for a few weeks per year. Longest overall VLTI Baseline 130m
VLTI +ATs AMBER	J, H, K simultaneously	4	46	130	400	0.3	1%	10	2000	Yes	Longest overall VLTI Baseline 130m
VLTI +UTs VINCI	K	11	46	130	400	0	>1%	-	1	Yes	Integrated optics beam combiner. Longest overall VLTI Baseline 130m
VLTI +ATs VINCI	K	Never checked	12	200	400	0	>1%	-	1	Yes	Longest overall VLTI Baseline 130m.
VLTI +UTs MIDI	N	4.5	46	130	200	0	10%	-	250	Yes	Used for a few weeks per year. Longest overall VLTI Baseline 130m. Dismantled Apr 2015
VLTI +ATs MIDI	N	4.5	?	200	200	0	10%	-	250	Yes	VLTI inldes World's largest unfilled apertures (siderostats, 1.8-m, 8-m). Longest overall VLTI Baseline 130m. Dismantled Apr 2015

== New interferometers and improvements to existing interferometers ==
Expected Future Performance of Astronomical Interferometers
Interferometer and observing mode	Waveband	Limiting magnitude	Minimum baseline (m) (un-projected)	Maximum baseline (m)	Approx. no. visibility measurements per year (measurements per night x nights used per year)	Max ratio of no. phase / no. amplitude measurements (measure of imaging performance, 0 = none)	Accuracy of amplitude^{2} measurements	Accuracy of phase measurements (milli-radians)	Number of spectral channels (max in use simultaneously)	Comments
LBTI (near infrared)	J, H, K	>20	0	22	10000000	1	30%	100	100?	2006?
MRO	R, I, J, H, K	14	7	400	100000	0.6	1%	10	1000?	Under Construction
VLTI (near infrared using 4 ATs and PRIMA)	J, H, K	12	8	200	10000	1	1%	0.1	4000?	decommissioned 2014
VLTI (near infrared using 3 UTs and PRIMA)	J, H, K	14	46	130	500	1	1%	0.3	4000?	decommissioned 2014
VLTI (near infrared using 4 UTs and MATISSE)	J, H, K, N, Q									commissioning 2017?

== See also ==
- Lists of telescopes
- Photometric system has a key for waveband letters.
