= Infrared Spatial Interferometer =

Astronomical telescope array

Coordinates: 34.2251°N 118.0644°W

The Infrared Spatial Interferometer (ISI) is an astronomical interferometer array of three 1.65 m (5 ft 5 in) telescopes operating in the mid-infrared. The telescopes are fully mobile and their site on Mount Wilson allows for placements as far as 70 m (230 ft) apart, giving the resolution of a telescope of that diameter. The signals are converted to radio frequencies through heterodyne circuits and then combined electronically using techniques copied from radio astronomy. ISI is operated by the University of California, Berkeley Space Sciences Laboratory. The longest (70 m (230 ft)) baseline provides a resolution of 0.003 arcsecond at a wavelength of 11 micrometres. On 9 July 2003, ISI recorded the first closure phase aperture synthesis measurements in the mid infrared.

== See also ==
- List of astronomical interferometers at visible and infrared wavelengths
