= Smear =

Smear may refer to:

- A smear test, wherein a sample is smeared over a microscope slide to be studied for any pathology
  - A smear test usually refers to a pap test, that is, a cervical smear
- Smear (card game)
- Smear Lake, a lake in Wisconsin
- Smear campaign, or smear job, an attack on the reputation of an individual or group making use of disinformation tactics
- Smear Campaign (album), an album by Napalm Death
- Pat Smear, the guitarist and actor
- Smear (optics), motion that degrades sharpness, which is generally linear over the integration time
- Colloquial name for a glissando, a glide from one musical pitch to another
- Smear (graffiti artist), a Romanian born street artist was influential in the Los Angeles graffiti scene in the 1990s.

Smearing may refer to:

- Smearing of an image taken by an astronomical interferometer:
  - Bandwidth smearing, a chromatic aberration;
  - Time smearing, a consequence of Earth rotation during the observation;
- Smearing (climbing), a technique of rock climbing
- Electron smearing, a tool for improving convergence in DFT calculations

== See also ==
- Smeared, the debut studio album by Canadian rock band Sloan
