= Jeff Kuhn =

American physicist and astronomer

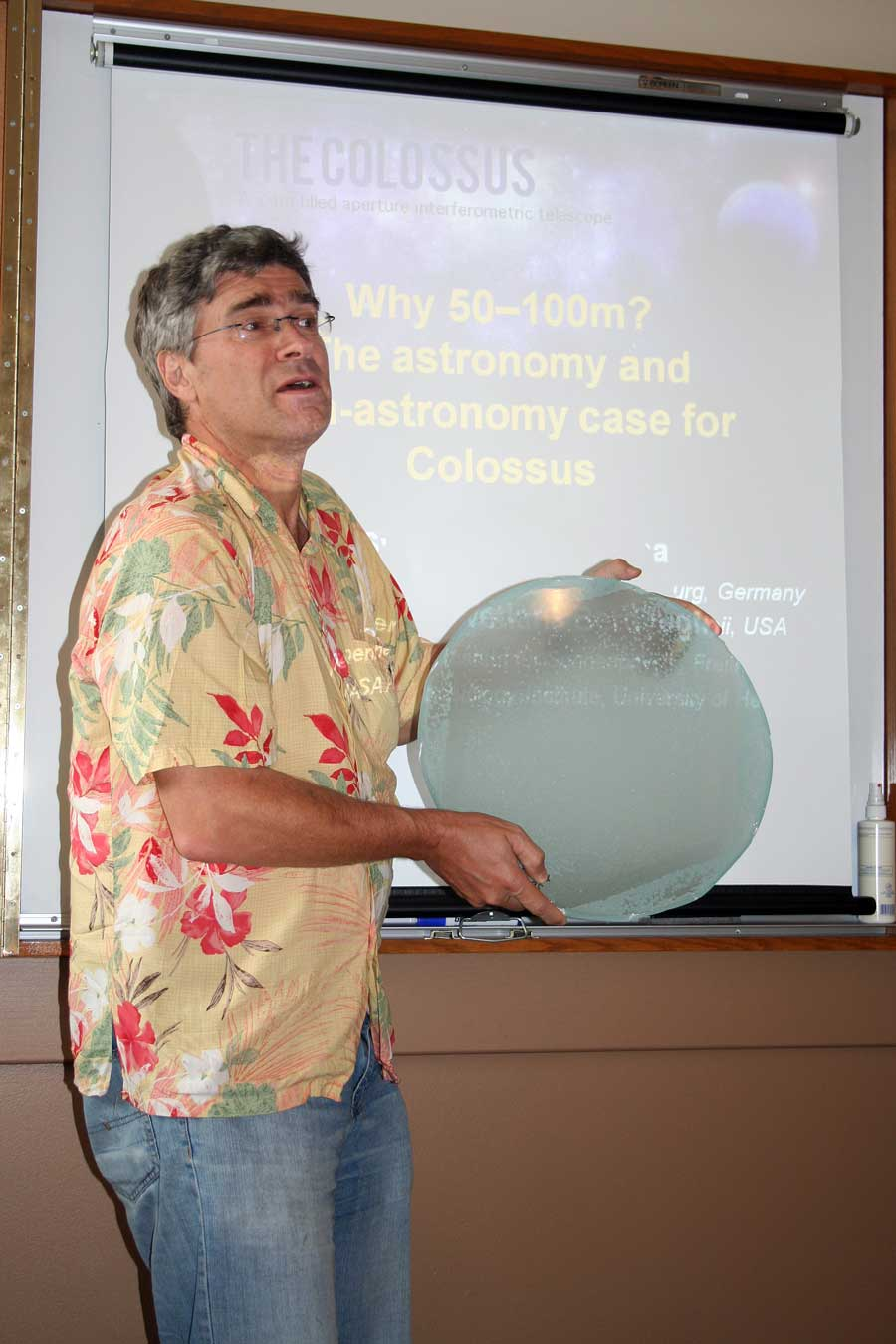
- Born: Jeffrey Richard Kuhn
- Education: B.A., physics and mathematics, Kalamazoo College, 1977; M.S., physics, Princeton, 1979; PhD, physics, Princeton, 1981
- Occupations: Professor; Astronomer; Physicist
- Organization(s): PLANETS Foundation; MorphOptics, Inc.
- Awards: University of Hawaiʻi Regents' Medal for Excellence in Research; 2010 Humboldt Prize

Jeffrey Richard Kuhn, also known as Jeff Kuhn, is an American physicist and astronomer who is a professor of astronomy at the University of Hawaiʻi. He is known for his contributions to astrophysics and the search for extraterrestrial life, particularly in the areas of telescope and detection system development, the study of the Sun and its corona, and the search for planets around other stars.

== Education ==
Kuhn received his bachelor's degree in physics and mathematics from Kalamazoo College in 1977, and then earned his master's and doctoral degrees in physics from Princeton University in 1979 and 1981, respectively, under the supervision of Robert Dicke.

== Career and research ==
Kuhn has held positions at various universities, including Princeton and Michigan State University, and has served as a visiting professor at several institutions around the world. He joined the Institute for Astronomy in Honolulu in 1997 and served as its associate director and director of the IfA/Maui division until 2015.

He has made contributions to the fields of astrophysics and the search for extraterrestrial life. He is known for his work on the development of telescopes and detection systems, including the Princeton Solar Distortion Telescope (PSDT), the National Solar Observatory Precision Solar Photometric Telescope (PSPT), and the University of Hawaiʻi Solar Observatory for Limb Active Regions and Coronae (Solar-C). He has also contributed to the design of the Daniel K. Inouye Solar Telescope (DKIST) and the Giant Magellan Telescope, and has conceived of other telescopes that are in the planning or construction phases, including the Polarized Light from Atmospheres of Nearby Extra-Terrestrial Systems (PLANETS) telescope and the Exo-Life Finder telescopes (ELF and MiniELF).

In addition to his work on telescopes, Kuhn has also made contributions to the study of the Sun and its corona. He has developed various infrared instruments for solar and solar coronal spectroscopy and spectropolarimetry, and has used satellite experiments to study small changes in the Sun's shape and brightness. His work has led to a better understanding of the Sun's magnetic field and its role in solar activity, such as solar flares and coronal mass ejections.

Kuhn is also involved in the search for planets around other stars. He co-founded the PLANETS Foundation, which aims to find and study planets around other stars, and has developed various instruments and algorithms for detecting and characterizing these planets. He has also co-founded the Colossus Project, which is a program to build a large telescope for searching for and studying exoplanets, and MorphOptics, Inc., which is a company that develops advanced optics and imaging systems for a variety of applications. Jeff is presently developing a telescope for solar observing on the top of Haleakala (volcano in Hawaii) a massive shield volcano, with the hopes of extending the observable universe that is visible to todays instruments.

=== Awards and recognition ===
Throughout his career, Kuhn has received numerous awards and honors for his scientific contributions, including the University of Hawaiʻi Regents' Medal for Excellence in Research, and the 2010 Humboldt Prize.

== Selected publications ==
- Svetlana V. Berdyugina; Jeff R. Kuhn; Maud Langlois; et al. (2018). "The Exo-Life Finder (ELF) telescope: New strategies for direct detection of exoplanet biosignatures and technosignatures". Proceedings of SPIE. doi:10.1117/12.2313781. Wikidata Q114737171.
- Svetlana V. Berdyugina; Jeff R. Kuhn, Surface Imaging of Proxima b and Other Exoplanets: Topography, Biosignatures, and Artificial Mega-Structures, arXiv:1711.00185, Wikidata Q114245112
- Svetlana V. Berdyugina; Jeff R. Kuhn; Ruslan Belikov; Slava G. Turyshev, Exoplanet Terra Incognita, arXiv:1809.05031, doi:10.1007/978-3-319-62849-3_20, Wikidata Q114245106
- Svetlana V. Berdyugina; Jeff R. Kuhn; David M. Harrington; Tina Šantl-Temkiv; E. John Messersmith (2015). "Remote sensing of life: polarimetric signatures of photosynthetic pigments as sensitive biomarkers". International Journal of Astrobiology. 15 (01): 45–56. doi:10.1017/s1473550415000129. Wikidata Q56455428.
- James P. Lloyd; James R. Graham; Paul R. Kalas; et al. (2001). "Astronomical coronagraphy with high-order adaptive optics systems". Proceedings of SPIE. doi:10.1117/12.455437. Wikidata Q59983350.
- Lewis C. Roberts, Jr.; Nils H. Turner; L. William Bradford; et al. (2005). "Adaptive Optics Photometry and Astrometry of Binary Stars". The Astronomical Journal. 130 (5): 2262–2271. Bibcode:2005AJ....130.2262R. doi:10.1086/491586. Wikidata Q59711576.
- Jeff R. Kuhn (2020). "Grand Challenges in Astronomical Instrumentation". Frontiers in Astronomy and Space Sciences. 7. Bibcode:2020FrASS...7...48K. doi:10.3389/fspas.2020.00048. Wikidata Q111975453.
- Gil Moretto; Jeff R. Kuhn (2014). "Highly sensitive telescope designs for higher contrast observations". Advanced Optical Technologies. 3 (3). doi:10.1515/aot-2014-0017. Wikidata Q53585626.
- Jeff R Kuhn; Svetlana V Berdyugina (2015). "Global warming as a detectable thermodynamic marker of Earth-like extrasolar civilizations: the case for a telescope like Colossus". International Journal of Astrobiology. 14 (3): 401–410. doi:10.1017/s1473550414000585. PMC 4541537. PMID 26321880. Wikidata Q28610509.
