= Anlaug Amanda Djupvik =

Norwegian astronomer

- Born: 1962 or 1963 (age 63–64); Førde, Norway
- Occupation: Astronomer

Anlaug Amanda Djupvik (formerly Kaas) is a Norwegian astronomer. Her main field of research is star formation and the origin of the initial mass function.

Minor planets discovered: 1
| 32892 Prufrock | February 22, 1994 | MPC |

She was born in Førde, a small town in Førde Municipality on the west coast of Norway. She grew up in an even smaller village called Leikong on the island of Gurskøya in Herøy Municipality, which is located to the south of the city of Ålesund. She started undergraduate studies at the Institute of Theoretical Astrophysics in Oslo in August 1986. In January 1992, she obtained the Norwegian Cand. Scient. degree (Master of Science) with her thesis Observations and analysis of the mutual phenomena of the Galilean satellites in 1990-1991, supervised by Kaare Aksnes.

From January 1992 to April 1994, she worked as a support astronomer at the Nordic Optical Telescope (NOT) of the Roque de los Muchachos Observatory site in La Palma, Canary Islands, a student position financed by Norges forskningsråd (The Norwegian Research Council), where she discovered the outer main-belt asteroid (32892) 1994 DW on 22 February. From April 1994 to April 1999 she did her Ph.D. studies at the Stockholm Observatory, Saltsjöbaden, Sweden, under Göran Olofsson.

From May 1999 to May 2000 she held a post-doc position at the Astrophysics Division of the European Space Agency, ESTEC, Noordwijk, working with Malcolm Fridlund. In the period 2000-2002 she was a member of a committee of the Norwegian Research Council. Since May 2000 she has been employed as an astronomer at the NOT, first as deputy astronomer-in-charge and later (2002) as acting astronomer-in-charge.
