= Fridlund =

Fridlund is a surname. Notable people with the surname include:

- Emily Fridlund (born 1979/80), American novelist and academic
- Johanne Fridlund (born 1996), Norwegian footballer
- Malcolm Fridlund (born 1952), Swedish astronomer
- Marcus Fridlund (born 1992), Swedish politician
