= Antoine Émile Henry Labeyrie =

French astronomer (born 1943)

Antoine Émile Henry Labeyrie (born 12 May 1943) is a French astronomer, who held the Observational astrophysics chair at the Collège de France between 1991 and 2014, where he is currently professor emeritus. He is working with the Hypertelescope Lise association, which aims to develop an extremely large astronomical interferometer with spherical geometry that might theoretically show features on Earth-like worlds around other suns, as its president. He is a member of the French Academy of Sciences in the Sciences of the Universe (sciences de l'univers) section. Between 1995 and 1999 he was director of the Haute-Provence Observatory.

Labeyrie graduated from the "grande école" SupOptique (École supérieure d'optique). He invented speckle interferometry, and works with astronomical interferometers. Labeyrie concentrated particularly on the use of "diluted optics" beam combination or "densified pupils" of a similar type but larger scale than those Michelson used for measuring the diameters of stars in the 1920s, in contrast to other astronomical interferometer researchers who generally switched to pupil-plane beam combination in the 1980s and 1990s.

The main-belt asteroid 8788 Labeyrie (1978 VP2) is named in honor of Antoine Émile Henry Labeyrie and Catherine Labeyrie. In 2000, he was awarded The Benjamin Franklin Medal.

== Hypertelescope ==
Labeyrie has proposed the idea of an astronomical interferometer where the individual telescopes are positioned in a spherical arrangement (requiring them to be positioned to a fraction of a wavelength). This geometry reduces the amount of pathlength compensation required when re-pointing the interferometer array (in fact a Mertz corrector can be used rather than delay lines), but otherwise is little different from other existing instruments. He has suggested a space-based interferometer array much larger (and more complex) than the Darwin and Terrestrial Planet Finder projects using this spherical geometry of array elements along with a densified pupil beam combiner, calling the endeavor a "Hypertelescope" project. It might theoretically show features on Earth-like worlds around other stars. According to New Scientist:

Sitting on Labeyrie's drawing board are plans for a hypertelescope, a new breed of space telescope that is capable of mapping distant cousins of Earth in exquisite detail... Malcolm Fridlund, project scientist for ESA's Darwin mission in Noordwijk, the Netherlands, is pragmatic. 'The costs would be really prohibitive,' he points out.

== See also ==
- Speckle imaging
- Exoplanets
- Fractionated spacecraft
- Satellite constellation
