= Radio astronomy =

Subfield of astronomy that studies celestial objects at radio frequencies

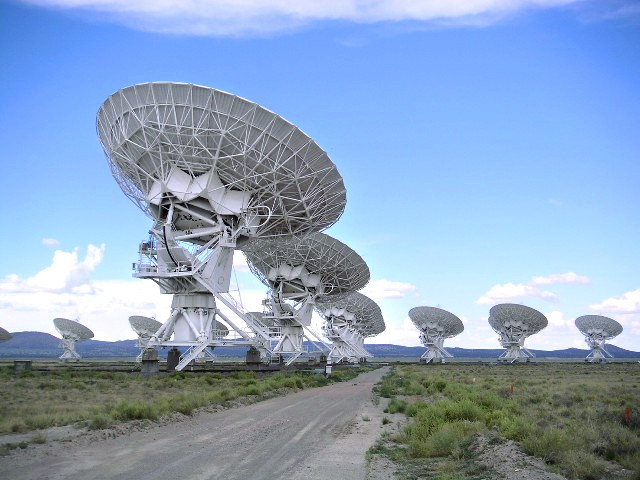
The Karl G. Jansky Very Large Array, a radio interferometer in New Mexico, United States

Radio astronomy is a subfield of astronomy that studies celestial objects using radio waves. It started in 1933, when Karl Jansky at Bell Telephone Laboratories reported radiation coming from the Milky Way. Subsequent observations have identified a number of different sources of radio emission. These include stars and galaxies, as well as entirely new classes of objects, such as radio galaxies, quasars, pulsars, and masers. The discovery of the cosmic microwave background radiation, regarded as evidence for the Big Bang theory, was made through radio astronomy.

Radio astronomy is conducted using large radio antennas referred to as radio telescopes, that are either used alone, or with multiple linked telescopes utilizing the techniques of radio interferometry and aperture synthesis. The use of interferometry allows radio astronomy to achieve high angular resolution, as the resolving power of an interferometer is set by the distance between its components, rather than the size of its components.

Radio astronomy differs from radar astronomy in that the former is a passive observation (i.e., receiving only) and the latter an active one (transmitting and receiving).

== History ==
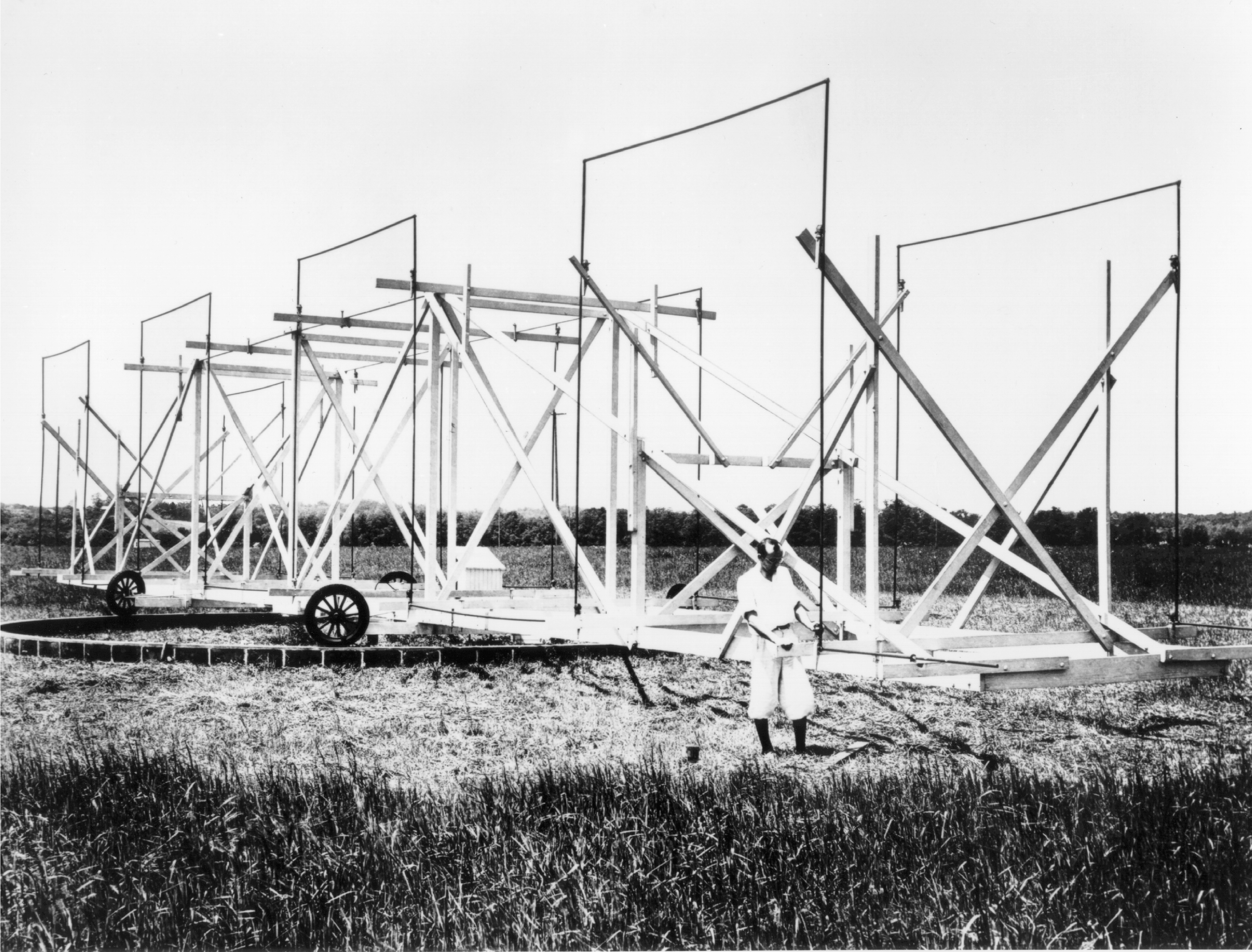
Karl Jansky and his rotating directional antenna in Holmdel, New Jersey, the world's first radio telescope, which was used to discover radio emissions from the Milky Way (c. early 1930s).

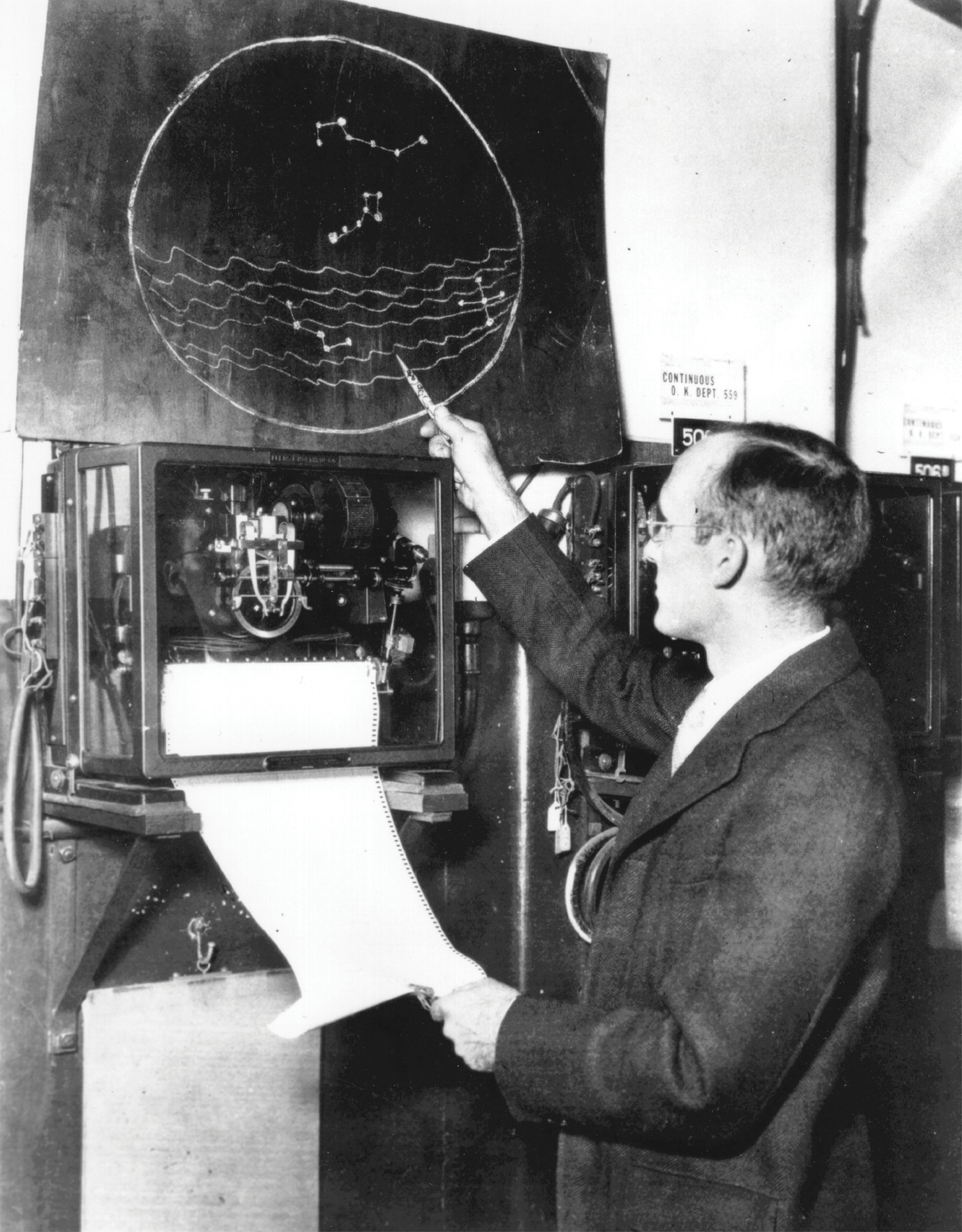
Jansky with a rough map of the night sky and pointing to the constellation of Cassiopeia. The wavy lines track the radio emissions he discovered on the chart paper, which also line up with the disk of the Milky Way.

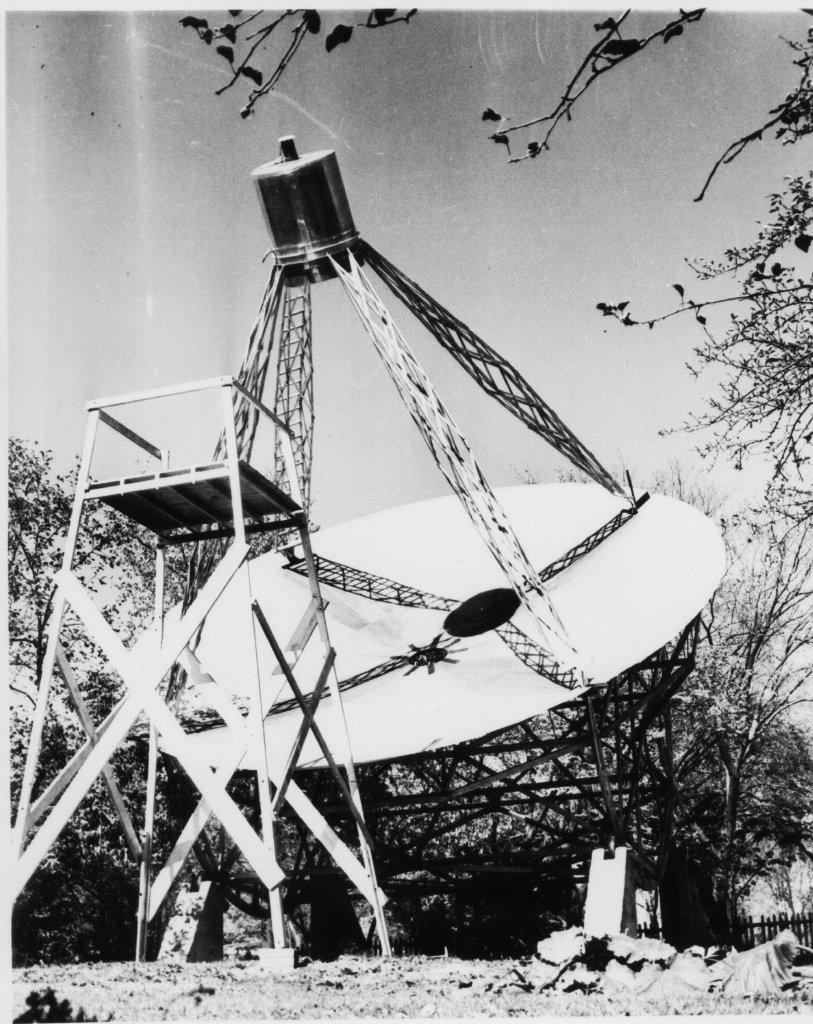
Grote Reber's 9 meter antenna in his backyard in Wheaton, Illinois, the world's first parabolic radio telescope

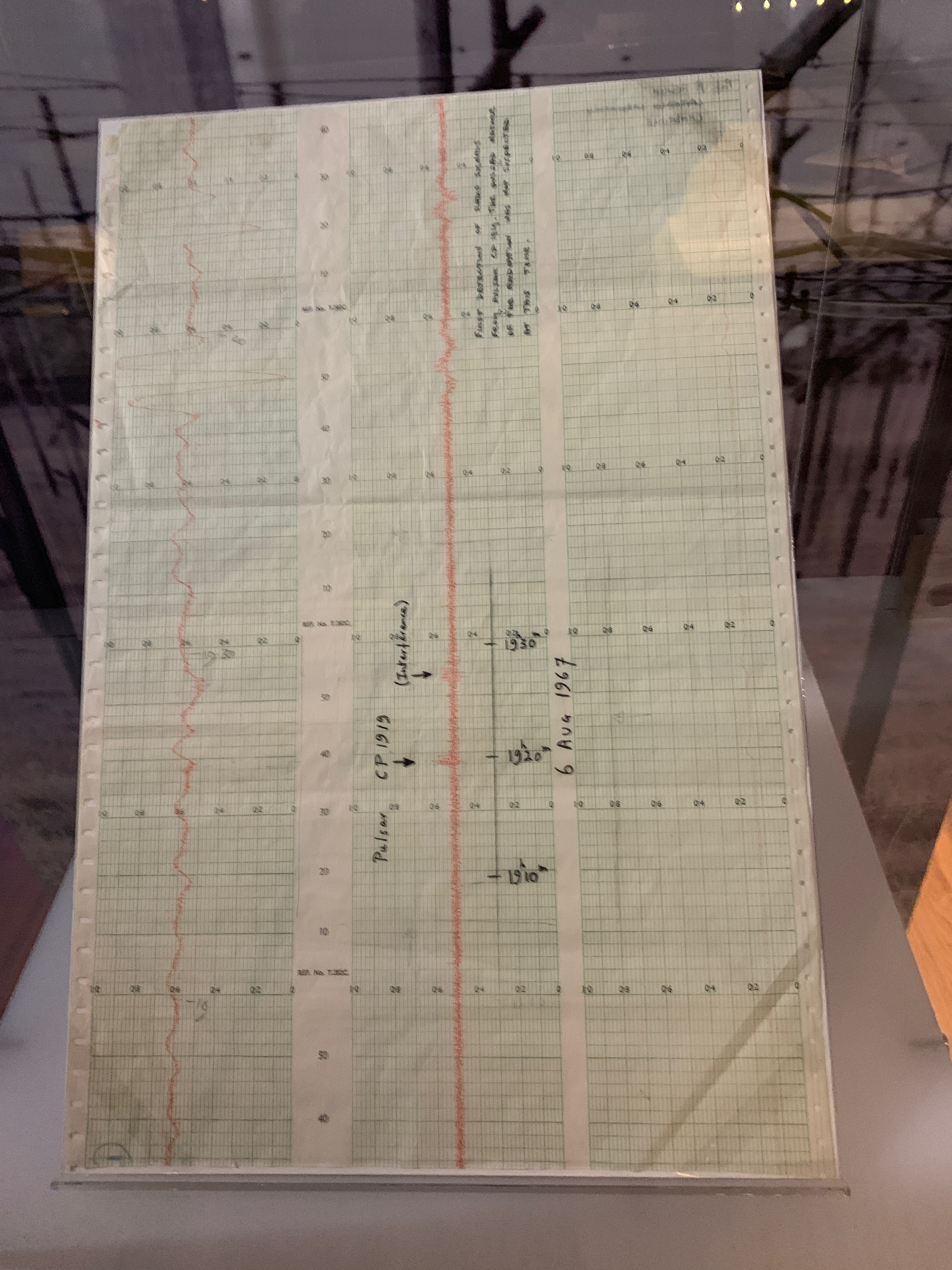
Chart on which Jocelyn Bell Burnell first recognized evidence of a pulsar, in 1967 (exhibited at Cambridge University Library).

Before Karl Jansky observed the Milky Way in the 1930s, physicists speculated that radio waves could be observed from astronomical sources.

In the 1860s, James Clerk Maxwell's equations showed that electromagnetic radiation is associated with electricity and magnetism, and could exist at any wavelength. Over the next few decades, several attempts were subsequently made to detect radio emissions from the Sun, but without success due to technical limitations of the instruments.

In 1896, an experiment by German astrophysicists Johannes Wilsing and Julius Scheiner attempted to detect solar radio emissions.

Between 1897 and 1900, a centimeter wave radiation apparatus set up by Oliver Lodge also attempted to detect solar radio emissions.

In 1902, upon the discovery of the radio-reflecting ionosphere, physicists concluded that the layer would bounce any solar or other astronomical radio transmissions back into space, making them undetectable.

In the early 1930s, Karl Jansky discovered the first astronomical radio source serendipitously. As a newly hired radio engineer with Bell Telephone Laboratories, he was assigned the task to investigate static that might interfere with short wave transatlantic voice transmissions. Using a large directional antenna, Jansky noticed that his analog pen-and-paper recording system kept recording a persistent repeating signal or "hiss" of unknown origin. Since the signal peaked about every 24 hours, Jansky first suspected the source of the interference was the Sun crossing the view of his directional antenna. Continued analysis, however, showed that the source was not following the 24-hour daily cycle of the Sun exactly but instead repeating on a cycle of 23 hours and 56 minutes. Jansky discussed the puzzling phenomena with his friend, astrophysicist Albert Melvin Skellett, who pointed out that the observed time between the signal peaks was the exact length of a sidereal day: the time it took for "fixed" astronomical objects, such as a star, to pass in front of the antenna every time the Earth rotated.

By comparing his observations with optical astronomical maps, Jansky eventually concluded that the radiation source peaked when his antenna was aimed at the densest part of the Milky Way in the constellation of Sagittarius.

In April 1933, Jansky announced his discovery at a meeting in Washington, D.C., and the field of radio astronomy was born.

In October 1933, Jansky's discovery was published in a journal article entitled "Electrical disturbances apparently of extraterrestrial origin" in the Proceedings of the Institute of Radio Engineers.

Jansky concluded that since the Sun (and therefore other stars) were not large emitters of radio noise, the strange radio interference might be generated by interstellar gas and dust in the galaxy, in particular, by "thermal agitation of charged particles".

After 1935, Jansky wanted to investigate the radio waves from the Milky Way in further detail, but Bell Labs reassigned him to another project, so he did no further work in the field of astronomy. His pioneering efforts in the field of radio astronomy have been recognized by the naming of the fundamental unit of flux density, the jansky (Jy), after him.

In 1937, radio amateur Grote Reber, inspired by Jansky's work, built a parabolic radio telescope 9 meters (30 ft) in diameter in his backyard in Wheaton, Illinois. He began by repeating Jansky's observations, and then conducted the first sky survey in the radio frequencies.

On 27 February 1942, James Stanley Hey, a British Army research officer, made the first detection of radio waves emitted by the Sun. Later that year, George Clark Southworth, at Bell Labs like Jansky, also detected radiowaves from the Sun. Both researchers were bound by wartime security surrounding radar, so Reber, who was not, published his 1944 findings first. Several other people independently discovered solar radio waves, including E. Schott in Denmark and Elizabeth Alexander working on Norfolk Island.

In the 1950s, Jansky's peak radio source, one of the brightest in the sky, was designated Sagittarius A and was later hypothesized to be emitted by electrons in a strong magnetic field. Current thinking is that these are ions in orbit around a massive black hole at the center of the galaxy at a point now designated as Sagittarius A*. The asterisk indicates that the particles at Sagittarius A are ionized.

In the 1950s, at Cambridge University, where ionospheric research had taken place during World War II, J. A. Ratcliffe along with other members of the Telecommunications Research Establishment that had carried out wartime research into radar, created a radiophysics group at the university where radio wave emissions from the Sun were observed and studied. This early research soon branched out into the observation of other celestial radio sources and interferometry techniques were pioneered to isolate the angular source of the detected emissions. Martin Ryle and Antony Hewish at the Cavendish Astrophysics Group developed the technique of Earth-rotation aperture synthesis. The radio astronomy group in Cambridge went on to found the Mullard Radio Astronomy Observatory near Cambridge.

During the late 1960s and early 1970s, as computers (such as the Titan) became capable of handling the computationally intensive Fourier transform inversions required, they used aperture synthesis to create a 'One-Mile' (1 mi (1.6 km)) and later a '5 km' (5 km (3.1 mi)) effective aperture using the One-Mile and Ryle telescopes, respectively. They used the Cambridge Interferometer to map the radio sky, producing the Second (2C) and Third (3C) Cambridge Catalogues of Radio Sources.

== Techniques ==
Window of radio waves observable from Earth, on rough plot of Earth's atmospheric absorption and scattering (or opacity) of various wavelengths of electromagnetic radiation

Radio astronomers use different techniques to observe objects in the radio spectrum. Instruments may simply be pointed at an energetic radio source to analyze its emission. To "image" a region of the sky in more detail, multiple overlapping scans can be recorded and pieced together in a mosaic image. The type of instrument used depends on the strength of the signal and the amount of detail needed.

Observations from the Earth's surface are limited to wavelengths that can pass through the atmosphere. At low frequencies or long wavelengths, transmission is limited by the ionosphere, which reflects waves with frequencies less than its characteristic plasma frequency. Thus far, radio observations have been made at frequencies as low as 15 MHz. Water vapor interferes with radio astronomy at higher frequencies, which has led to building radio observatories that conduct observations at millimeter wavelengths at very high and dry sites to minimize the water vapor content in the line of sight. Finally, transmitting devices on Earth may cause radio-frequency interference. Because of this, many radio observatories are built at remote places.

=== Radio telescopes ===
Radio telescopes may need to be extremely large in order to receive signals with low signal-to-noise ratio. Also since angular resolution is a function of the diameter of the "objective" in proportion to the wavelength of the electromagnetic radiation being observed, radio telescopes have to be much larger in comparison to their optical counterparts. For example, a 1-meter diameter optical telescope is two million times bigger than the wavelength of light observed giving it a resolution of roughly 0.3 arc seconds, whereas a radio telescope "dish" many times that size may, depending on the wavelength observed, only be able to resolve an object the size of the full moon (30 minutes of arc).

=== Radio interferometry ===
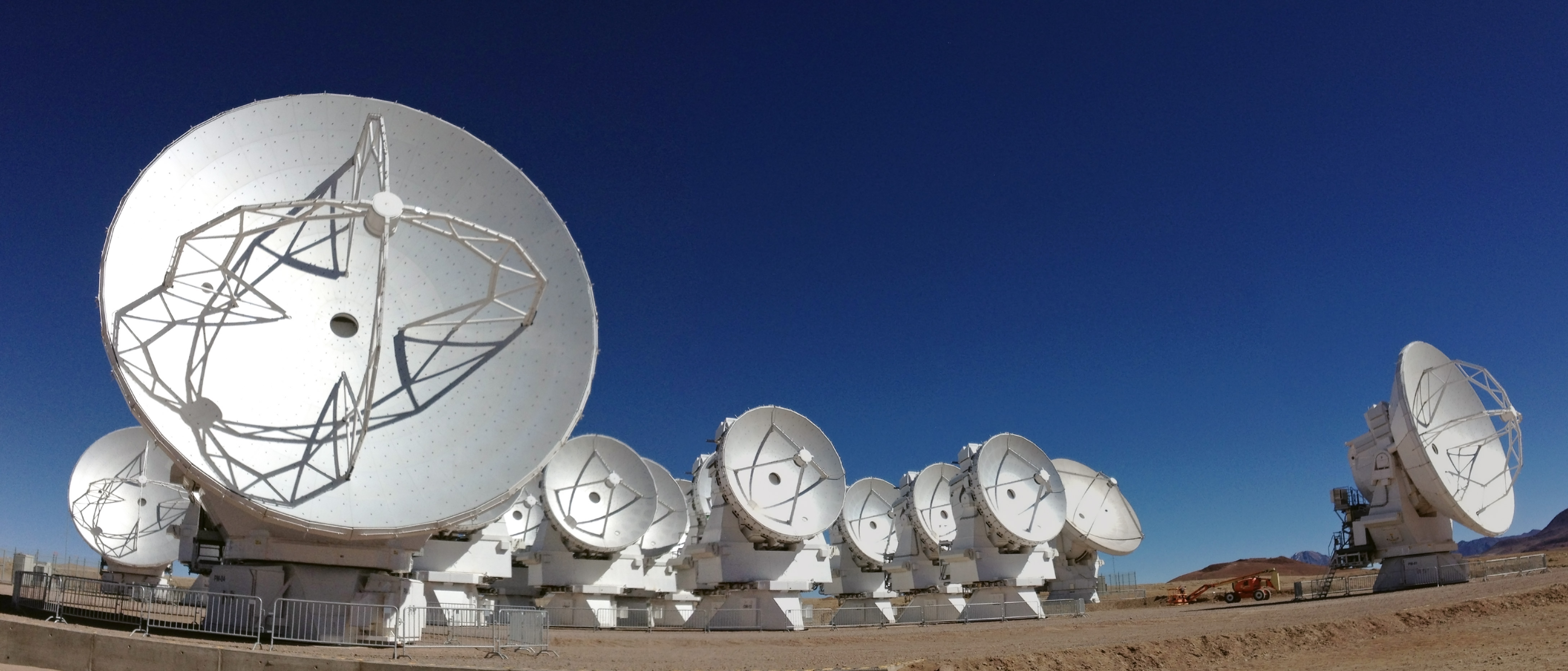
The Atacama Large Millimeter Array (ALMA), many antennas linked together in a radio interferometer

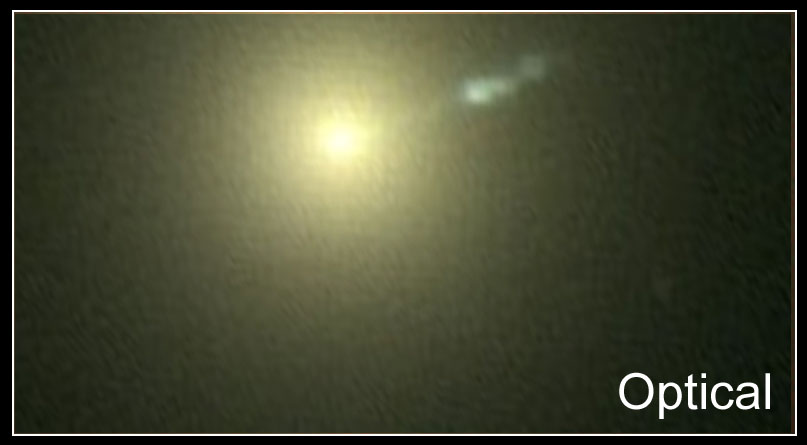

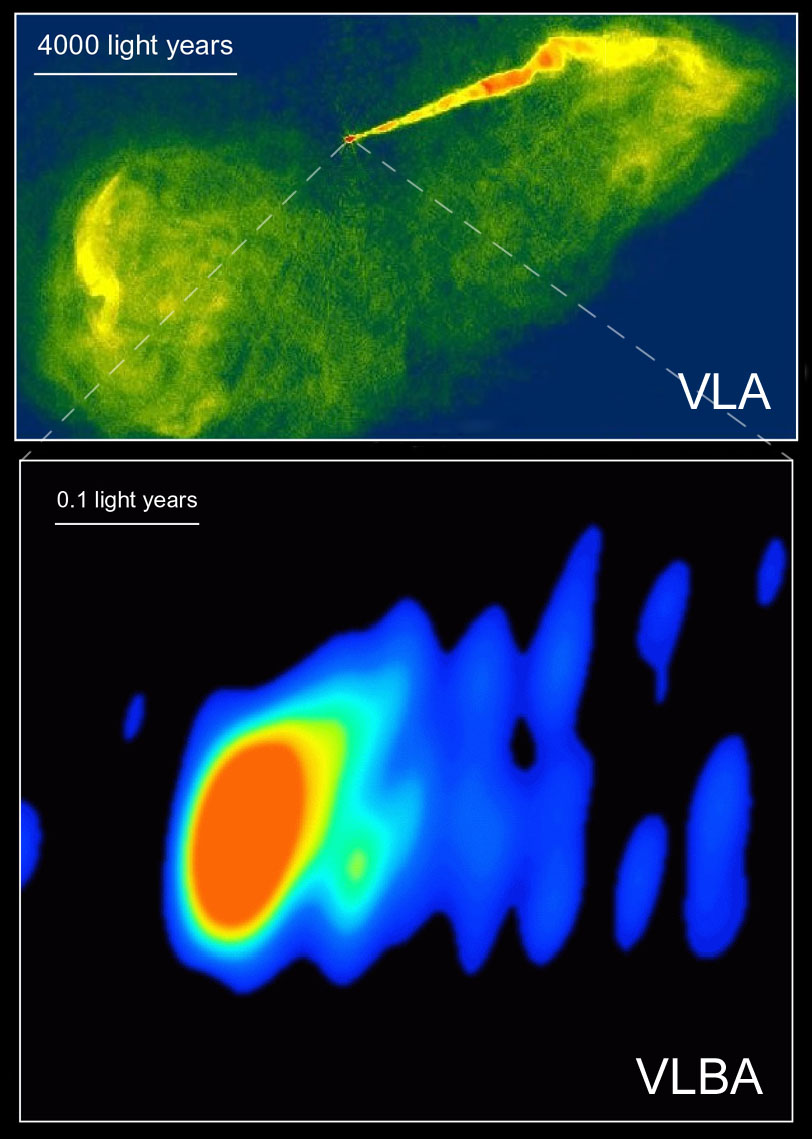
An optical image of the galaxy M87 (HST), a radio image of same galaxy using interferometry (Very Large Array, VLA), and an image of the center section (VLBA) using a Very Long Baseline Array (Global VLBI) consisting of antennas in the US, Germany, Italy, Finland, Sweden and Spain. The jet of particles is suspected to be powered by a black hole in the center of the galaxy.

The difficulty in achieving high resolutions with single radio telescopes led to radio interferometry, developed by British radio astronomer Martin Ryle and Australian engineer, radiophysicist, and radio astronomer Joseph Lade Pawsey and Ruby Payne-Scott in 1946. The first use of a radio interferometer for an astronomical observation was carried out by Payne-Scott, Pawsey and Lindsay McCready on 26 January 1946 using a single converted radar antenna (broadside array) at 200 MHz near Sydney, Australia. This group used the principle of a sea-cliff interferometer in which the antenna (formerly a World War II radar) observed the Sun at sunrise with interference arising from the direct radiation from the Sun and the reflected radiation from the sea. With this baseline of almost 200 meters, the authors determined that the solar radiation during the burst phase was much smaller than the solar disk and arose from a region associated with a large sunspot group. The Australia group laid out the principles of aperture synthesis in a groundbreaking paper published in 1947. The use of a sea-cliff interferometer had been demonstrated by numerous groups in Australia, Iran and the UK during World War II, who had observed interference fringes (the direct radar return radiation and the reflected signal from the sea) from incoming aircraft.

The Cambridge group of Ryle and Vonberg observed the Sun at 175 MHz for the first time in mid-July 1946 with a Michelson interferometer consisting of two radio antennas with spacings of some tens of meters up to 240 meters. They showed that the radio radiation was smaller than 10 arc minutes in size and also detected circular polarization in the Type I bursts. Two other groups had also detected circular polarization at about the same time (David Martyn in Australia and Edward Appleton with James Stanley Hey in the UK).

Modern radio interferometers consist of widely separated radio telescopes observing the same object that are connected together using coaxial cable, waveguide, optical fiber, or other type of transmission line. This not only increases the total signal collected, but it can also be used in a process called aperture synthesis to vastly increase resolution. This technique works by superposing ("interfering") the signal waves from the different telescopes on the principle that waves that coincide with the same phase will add to each other while two waves that have opposite phases will cancel each other out. This creates a combined telescope that is the size of the antennas furthest apart in the array. To produce a high-quality image, a large number of different separations between different telescopes are required (the projected separation between any two telescopes as seen from the radio source is called a "baseline") – as many different baselines as possible are required in order to get a good quality image. For example, the Very Large Array has 27 telescopes giving 351 independent baselines at once.

==== Very-long-baseline interferometry ====
Beginning in the 1970s, improvements in the stability of radio telescope receivers permitted telescopes from all over the world (and even in Earth orbit) to be combined to perform very-long-baseline interferometry. Instead of physically connecting the antennas, data received at each antenna is paired with timing information, usually from a local atomic clock, and then stored for later analysis on magnetic tape or hard disk. At that later time, the data is correlated with data from other antennas similarly recorded, to produce the resulting image. Using this method, it is possible to synthesise an antenna that is effectively the size of the Earth. The large distances between the telescopes enable very high angular resolutions to be achieved, much greater in fact than in any other field of astronomy. At the highest frequencies, synthesised beams less than 1 milliarcsecond are possible.

The pre-eminent VLBI arrays operating today are the Very Long Baseline Array (with telescopes located across North America) and the European VLBI Network (telescopes in Europe, China, South Africa and Puerto Rico). Each array usually operates separately, but occasional projects are observed together producing increased sensitivity. This is referred to as Global VLBI. There are also a VLBI networks, operating in Australia and New Zealand called the LBA (Long Baseline Array), and arrays in Japan, China and South Korea which observe together to form the East-Asian VLBI Network (EAVN).

Since its inception, recording data onto hard media was the only way to bring the data recorded at each telescope together for later correlation. However, the availability today of worldwide, high-bandwidth networks makes it possible to do VLBI in real time. This technique (referred to as e-VLBI) was originally pioneered in Japan, and more recently adopted in Australia and in Europe by the EVN (European VLBI Network) who perform an increasing number of scientific e-VLBI projects per year.

== Astronomical sources ==
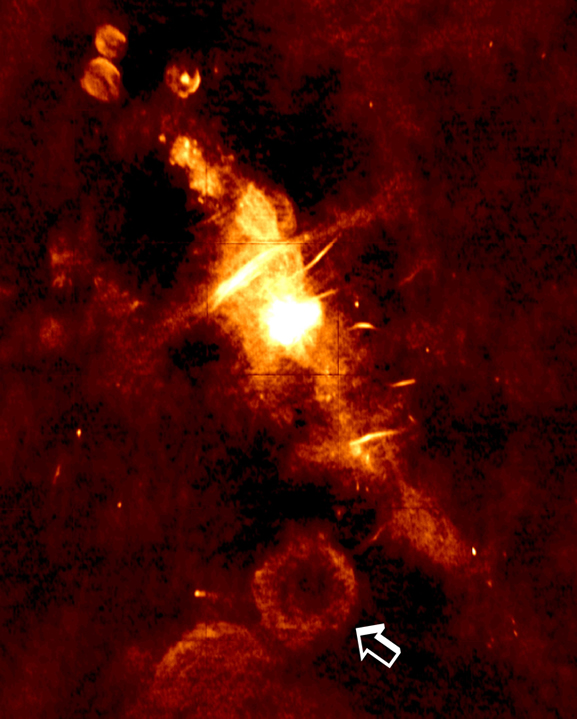
A radio image of the central region of the Milky Way galaxy. The arrow indicates a supernova remnant which is the location of a newly discovered transient, bursting low-frequency radio source GCRT J1745-3009.

Radio astronomy has led to substantial increases in astronomical knowledge, particularly with the discovery of several classes of new objects, including pulsars, quasars and radio galaxies. This is because radio astronomy allows us to see things that are not detectable in optical astronomy. Such objects represent some of the most extreme and energetic physical processes in the universe.

The cosmic microwave background radiation was also first detected using radio telescopes. However, radio telescopes have also been used to investigate objects much closer to home, including observations of the Sun and solar activity, and radar mapping of the planets.

Other sources include:

- Sun
- Jupiter
- Sagittarius A, the Galactic Center of the Milky Way, with one portion Sagittarius A* thought to be a radio wave–emitting supermassive black hole
- Active galactic nuclei and pulsars have jets of charged particles which emit synchrotron radiation
- Merging galaxy clusters often show diffuse radio emission
- Supernova remnants can also show diffuse radio emission; pulsars are a type of supernova remnant that shows highly synchronous emission.
- The cosmic microwave background is blackbody radio/microwave emission

Earth's radio signal is mostly natural and stronger than for example Jupiter's but is produced by Earth's auroras and bounces at the ionosphere back into space.

== International regulation ==
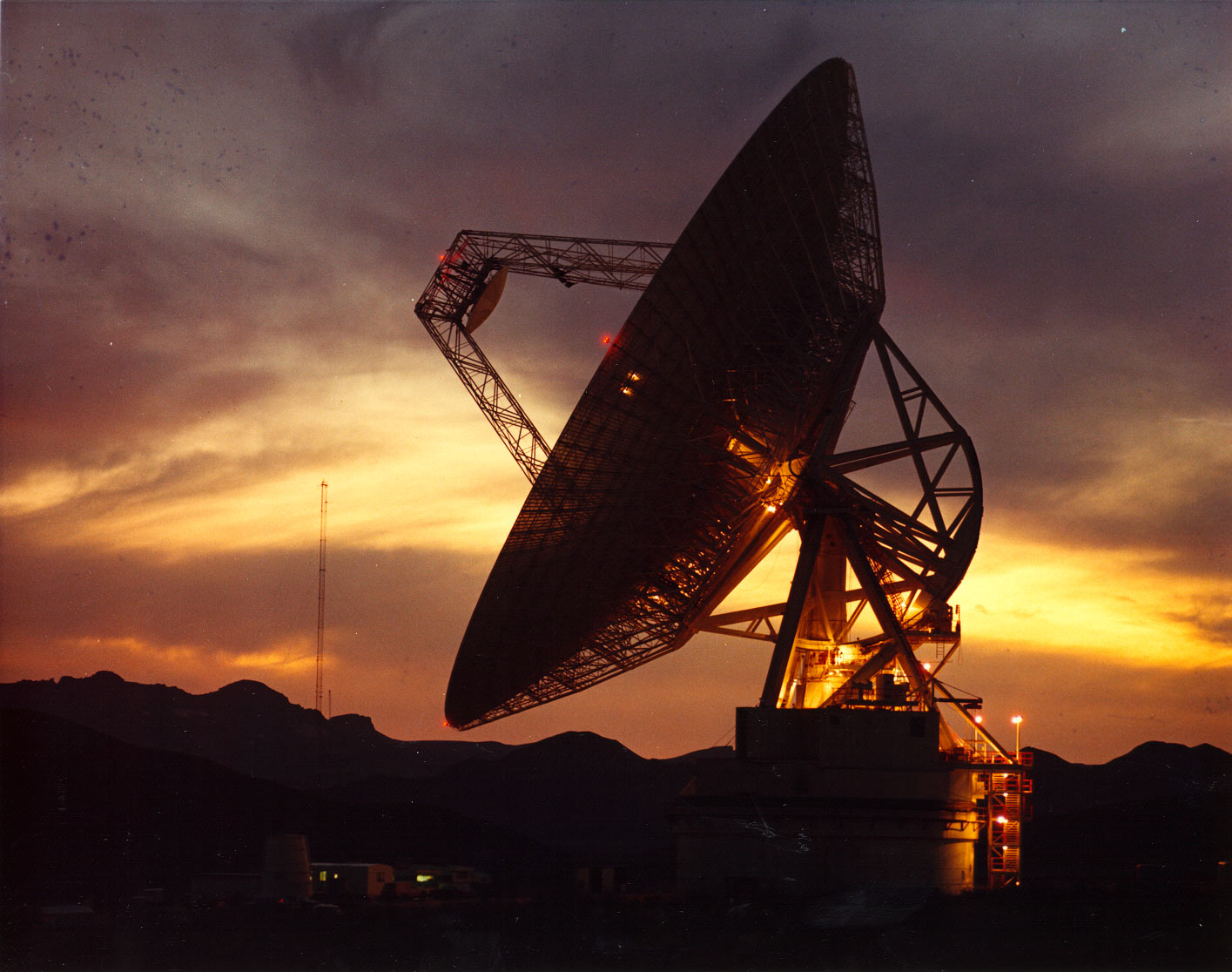
Antenna 70 m of the Goldstone Deep Space Communications Complex, California

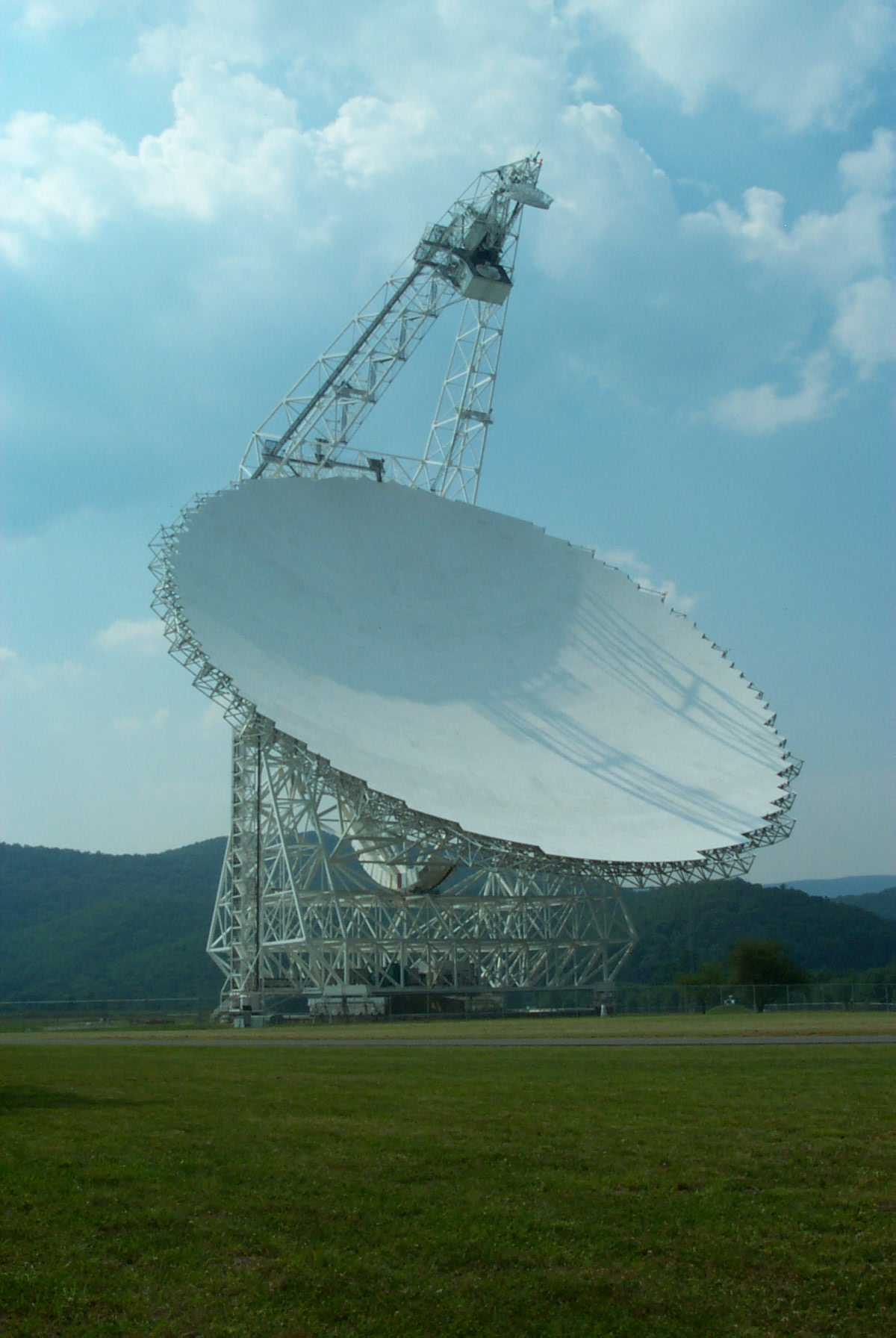
Antenna 110m of the Green Bank radio telescope, US

Jupiter radio-bursts

Radio astronomy service (also: radio astronomy radiocommunication service) is, according to Article 1.58 of the International Telecommunication Union's (ITU) Radio Regulations (RR), defined as "A radiocommunication service involving the use of radio astronomy". Subject of this radiocommunication service is to receive radio waves transmitted by astronomical or celestial objects.

=== Frequency allocation ===
The allocation of radio frequencies is provided according to Article 5 of the ITU Radio Regulations (edition 2012).

To improve harmonisation in spectrum utilisation, the majority of service-allocations stipulated in this document were incorporated in national Tables of Frequency Allocations and Utilisations which is within the responsibility of the appropriate national administration. The allocation might be primary, secondary, exclusive, and shared.

- primary allocation: indicated by writing in capital letters (see example below)
- secondary allocation: indicated by small letters
- exclusive or shared utilization: within the responsibility of administrations

In line to the appropriate ITU Region, the frequency bands are allocated (primary or secondary) to the radio astronomy service as follows.

Allocation to services
Region 1	Region 2	Region 3
13 360–13 410 kHz FIXED RADIO ASTRONOMY
25 550–25 650 RADIO ASTRONOMY
37.5–38.25 MHz FIXED MOBILE; Radio astronomy
322–328.6 FIXED MOBILE; RADIO ASTRONOMY
406.1–410 FIXED MOBILE except aeronautical mobile RADIO ASTRONOMY
1 400–1 427 EARTH EXPLORATION-SATELLITE (passive) RADIO ASTRONOMY; SPACE RESEARCH (passive)
1 610.6–1 613.8 MOBILE-SATELLITE (Earth-to-space) RADIO ASTRONOMY; AERONAUTICAL RADIONAVIGATION	1 610.6–1 613.8 MOBILE-SATELLITE (Earth-to-space) RADIO ASTRONOMY; AERONAUTICAL RADIONAVIGATION RADIODETERMINATION- SATELLITE (Earth-to-space)	1 610.6–1 613.8 MOBILE-SATELLITE (Earth-to-space) RADIO ASTRONOMY; AERONAUTICAL RADIONAVIGATION Radiodetermination- satellite (Earth-to-space)
10.6–10.68 GHz RADIO ASTRONOMY and other services
10.68–10.7 RADIO ASTRONOMY and other services
14.47–14.5 RADIO ASTRONOMY and other services
15.35–15.4 RADIO ASTRONOMY and other services
22.21–22.5 RADIO ASTRONOMY and other services
23.6–24 RADIO ASTRONOMY and other services
31.3–31.5 RADIO ASTRONOMY and other services

== See also ==
- Atacama Large Millimeter Array
- Submillimeter Array
- Channel 37
- Gamma-ray astronomy
- Infrared astronomy
- Radar astronomy
- Time smearing
- X-ray astronomy
- Waves (Juno) (radio instrument on the Juno Jupiter orbiter)
- Radio Galaxy Zoo
- Würzburg radar#Post-war use in astronomy
