= Time smearing =

Time-based degradation of interferometric images

Time smearing or time-average smearing is the degradation of the reconstructed image of a celestial body observed by a ground-based interferometer that occurs because of the duration of the observation. Unlike single telescopes or cameras that can compensate for the Earth's rotation in real time using a dedicated mount, the different telescopes of the interferometer are at fixed positions on the Earth. As a result, maps obtained with interferometers feature elongated orthoradial features similar to those of night sky photographs taken with a fixed tripod, unless they use short enough integration times.

The smearing is a problem for long integration times or very separated telescopes. Mostly an issue in radioastronomy, it severely limits the usable field of view of observations in very long baseline interferometry.

== See also ==
- Radio astronomy#Radio interferometry
- Radio telescope#Radio interferometry
