= Astronomical interferometer =

Array used for astronomical observations

An astronomical interferometer or telescope array is a set of separate telescopes, mirror segments, or radio telescope antennas that work together as a single telescope to provide higher resolution images of astronomical objects such as stars, nebulas and galaxies by means of interferometry. The advantage of this technique is that it can theoretically produce images with the angular resolution of a huge telescope with an aperture equal to the separation, called baseline, between the component telescopes. The main drawback is that it does not collect as much light as the complete instrument's mirror. Thus it is mainly useful for fine resolution of more luminous astronomical objects, such as close binary stars. Another drawback is that the maximum angular size of a detectable emission source is limited by the minimum gap between detectors in the collector array.

Interferometry is most widely used in radio astronomy, in which signals from separate radio telescopes are combined. A mathematical signal processing technique called aperture synthesis is used to combine the separate signals to create high-resolution images. In Very Long Baseline Interferometry (VLBI) radio telescopes separated by thousands of kilometers are combined to form a radio interferometer with a resolution which would be given by a hypothetical single dish with an aperture thousands of kilometers in diameter. At the shorter wavelengths used in infrared astronomy and optical astronomy it is more difficult to combine the light from separate telescopes, because the light must be kept coherent within a fraction of a wavelength over long optical paths, requiring very precise optics. Practical infrared and optical astronomical interferometers have only recently been developed, and are at the cutting edge of astronomical research. At optical wavelengths, aperture synthesis allows the atmospheric seeing resolution limit to be overcome, allowing the angular resolution to reach the diffraction limit of the optics.

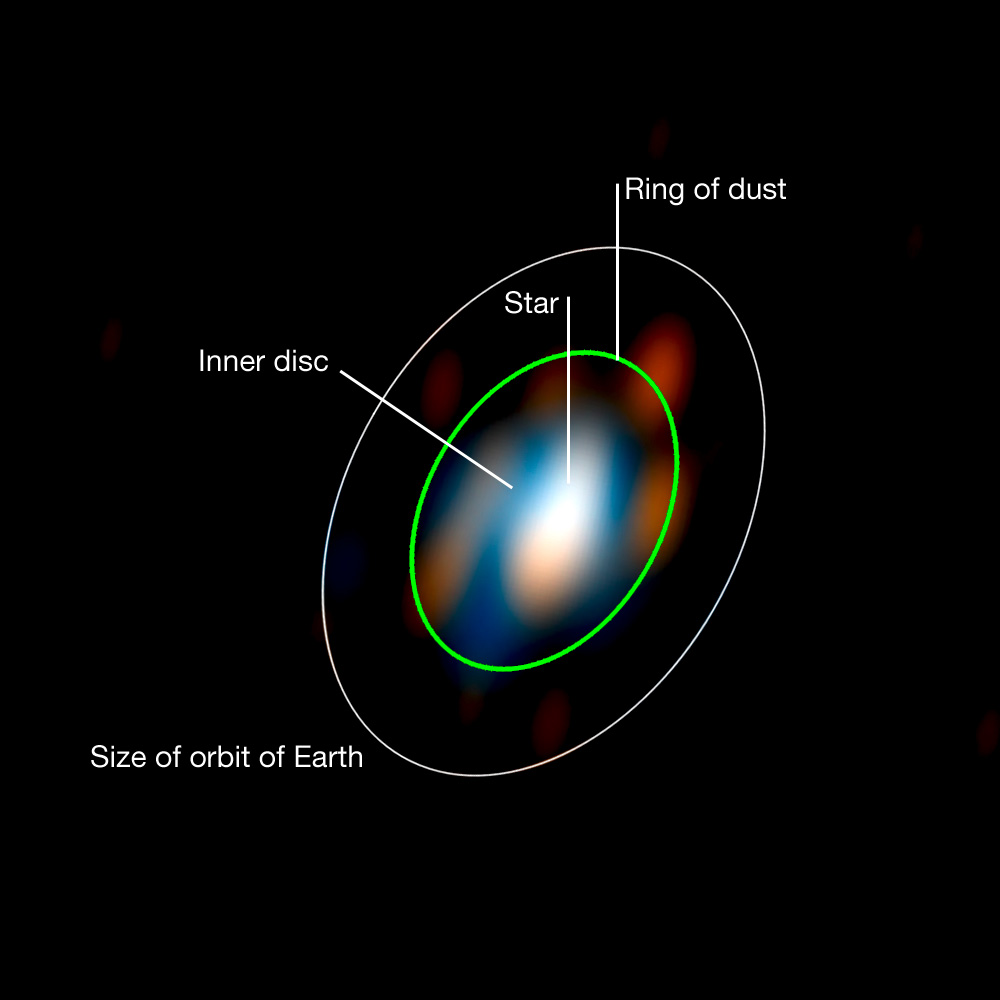
ESO's VLT interferometer took the first detailed image of a disc around a young star.

Astronomical interferometers can produce higher resolution astronomical images than any other type of telescope. At radio wavelengths, image resolutions of a few microarcseconds (a dozen picoradians) have been obtained, and image resolutions of hundreds of microarcseconds (a couple nanoradians) have been achieved at visible and infrared wavelengths.

One simple layout of an astronomical interferometer is a parabolic arrangement of mirror pieces, giving a partially complete reflecting telescope but with a "sparse" or "dilute" aperture. In fact, the parabolic arrangement of the mirrors is not important, as long as the optical path lengths from the astronomical object to the beam combiner (focus) are the same as would be given by the complete mirror case. Instead, most existing arrays use a planar geometry, and Labeyrie's hypertelescope will use a spherical geometry.

== History ==
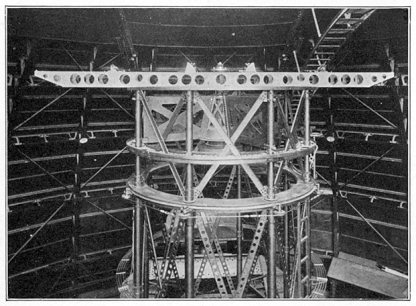
A 20-foot Michelson interferometer mounted on the frame of the 100-inch Hooker Telescope, 1920.

One of the first uses of optical interferometry was applied by the Michelson stellar interferometer on the Mount Wilson Observatory's reflector telescope to measure the diameters of stars. The red giant star Betelgeuse was the first to have its diameter determined in this way on December 13, 1920. In the 1940s radio interferometry was used to perform the first high resolution radio astronomy observations. For the next three decades astronomical interferometry research was dominated by research at radio wavelengths, leading to the development of large instruments such as the Very Large Array and the Atacama Large Millimeter Array.

Optical/infrared interferometry was extended to measurements using separated telescopes by Johnson, Betz and Townes (1974) in the infrared and by Labeyrie (1975) in the visible. In the late 1970s improvements in computer processing allowed for the first "fringe-tracking" interferometer, which operates fast enough to follow the blurring effects of astronomical seeing, leading to the Mk I, II and III series of interferometers. Similar techniques have now been applied at other astronomical telescope arrays, including the Keck Interferometer and the Palomar Testbed Interferometer.

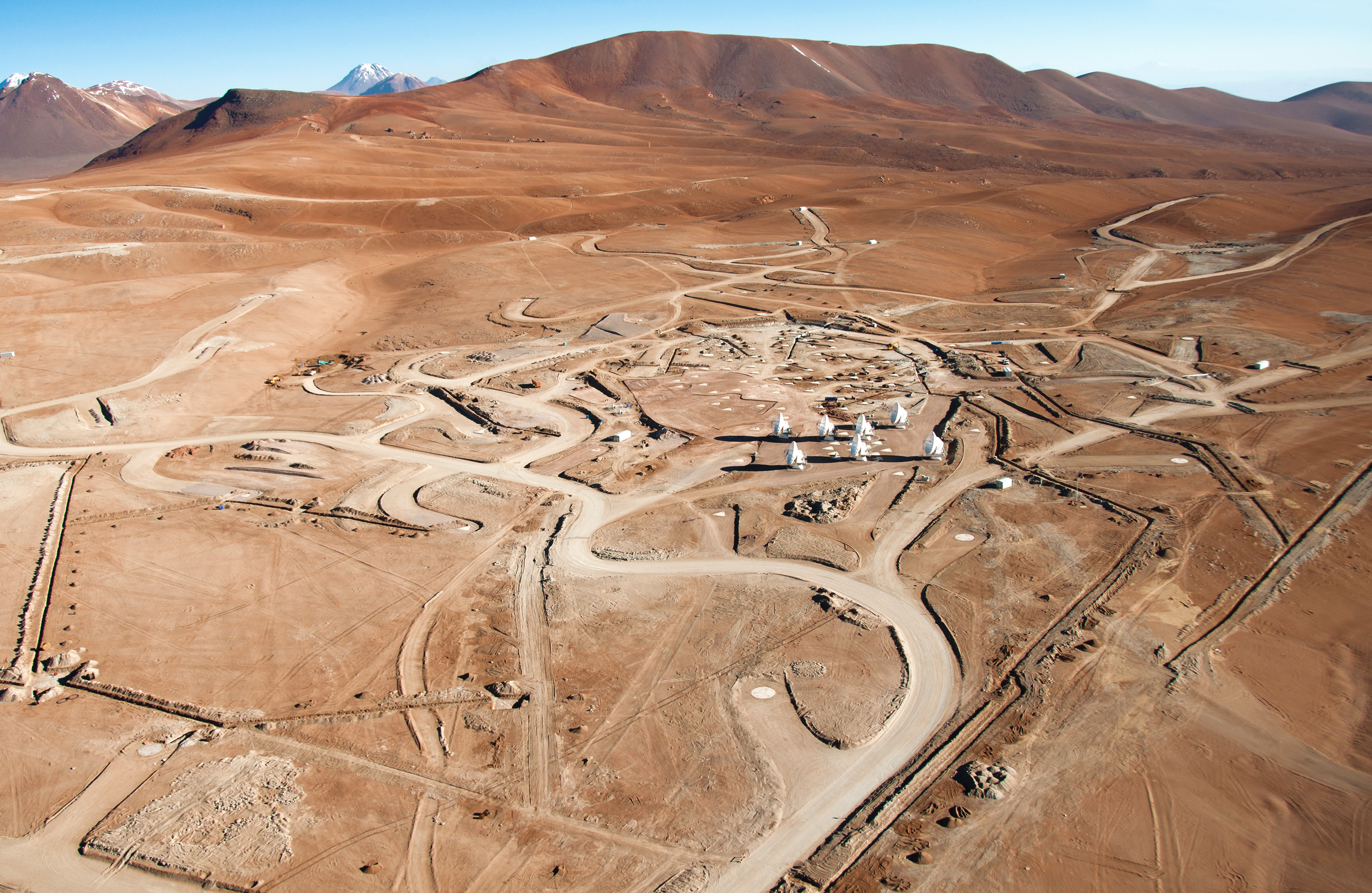
Aerial view of the ESO/NAOJ/NRAO ALMA construction site.

In the 1980s the aperture synthesis interferometric imaging technique was extended to visible light and infrared astronomy by the Cavendish Astrophysics Group, providing the first very high resolution images of nearby stars. In 1995 this technique was demonstrated on an array of separate optical telescopes for the first time, allowing a further improvement in resolution, and allowing even higher resolution imaging of stellar surfaces. Software packages such as BSMEM or MIRA are used to convert the measured visibility amplitudes and closure phases into astronomical images. The same techniques have now been applied at a number of other astronomical telescope arrays, including the Navy Precision Optical Interferometer, the Infrared Spatial Interferometer and the IOTA array. A number of other interferometers have made closure phase measurements and are expected to produce their first images soon, including the VLTI, the CHARA array and Le Coroller and Dejonghe's Hypertelescope prototype. If completed, the MRO Interferometer with up to ten movable telescopes will produce among the first higher fidelity images from a long baseline interferometer. The Navy Optical Interferometer took the first step in this direction in 1996, achieving 3-way synthesis of an image of Mizar; then a first-ever six-way synthesis of Eta Virginis in 2002; and most recently "closure phase" as a step to the first synthesized images produced by geostationary satellites.

== Modern astronomical interferometry ==
Astronomical interferometry is principally conducted using Michelson (and sometimes other type) interferometers. The principal operational interferometric observatories which use this type of instrumentation include VLTI, NPOI, and CHARA.

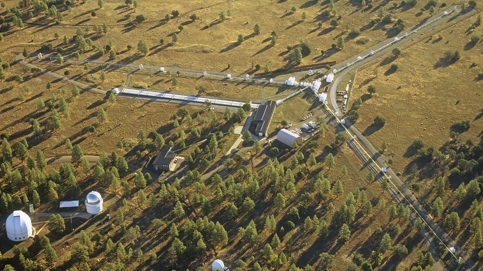
The Navy Precision Optical Interferometer (NPOI), a 437 ma baselined optical/near-infrared, 6-beam Michelson Interferometer at 2163 m elevation on Anderson Mesa in Northern Arizona, USA. Four additional 1.8-meter telescopes are being installed starting from 2013.

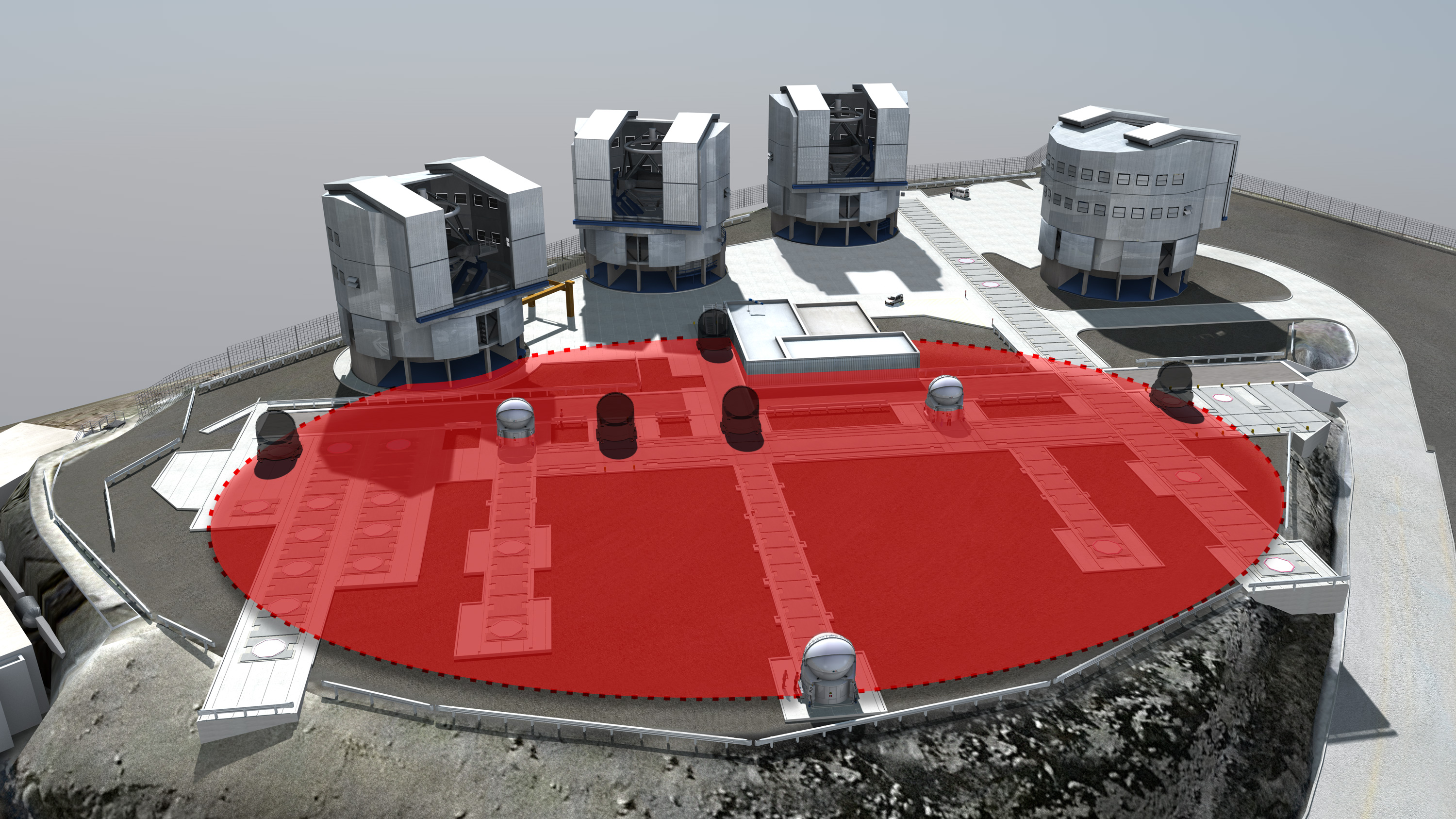
Light collected by three ESO VLT auxiliary telescopes, and combined using the technique of interferometry.

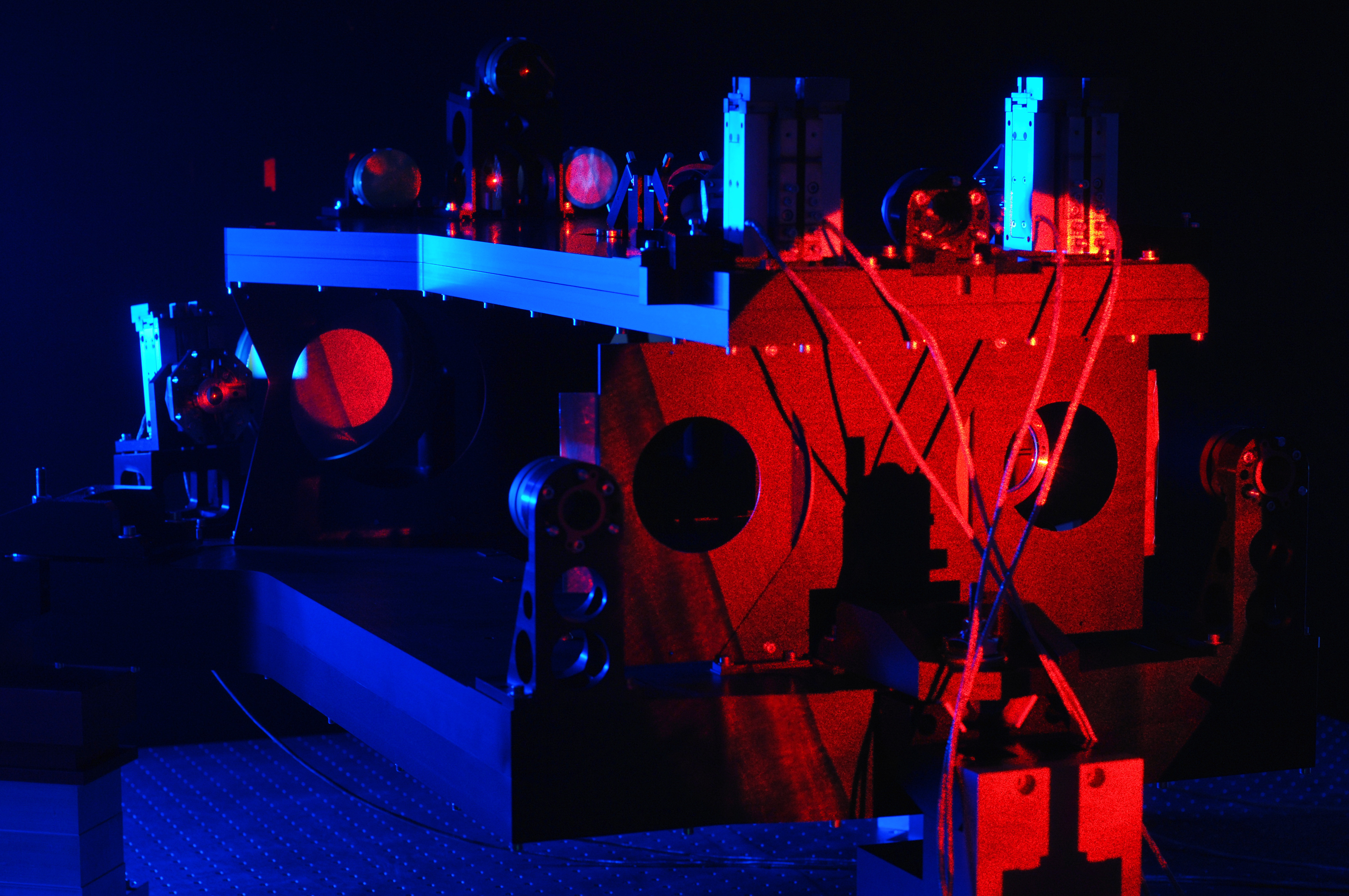
This image shows one of a series of sophisticated optical and mechanical systems called star separators for the Very Large Telescope Interferometer (VLTI).

Current projects will use interferometers to search for extrasolar planets, either by astrometric measurements of the reciprocal motion of the star (as used by the Palomar Testbed Interferometer and the VLTI), through the use of nulling (as will be used by the Keck Interferometer and Darwin) or through direct imaging (as proposed for Labeyrie's Hypertelescope).

Engineers at the European Southern Observatory ESO designed the Very Large Telescope VLT so that it can also be used as an interferometer. Along with the four 8.2-metre (320 in) unit telescopes, four mobile 1.8-metre auxiliary telescopes (ATs) were included in the overall VLT concept to form the Very Large Telescope Interferometer (VLTI). The ATs can move between 30 different stations, and at present, the telescopes can form groups of two or three for interferometry.

When using interferometry, a complex system of mirrors brings the light from the different telescopes to the astronomical instruments where it is combined and processed. This is technically demanding as the light paths must be kept equal to within 1/1000 mm (the same order as the wavelength of light) over distances of a few hundred metres. For the Unit Telescopes, this gives an equivalent mirror diameter of up to 130 metres (430 ft), and when combining the auxiliary telescopes, equivalent mirror diameters of up to 200 metres (660 ft) can be achieved. This is up to 25 times better than the resolution of a single VLT unit telescope.

The VLTI gives astronomers the ability to study celestial objects in unprecedented detail. It is possible to see details on the surfaces of stars and even to study the environment close to a black hole. With a spatial resolution of 4 milliarcseconds, the VLTI has allowed astronomers to obtain one of the sharpest images ever of a star. This is equivalent to resolving the head of a screw at a distance of 300 km (190 mi).

Notable 1990s results included the Mark III measurement of diameters of 100 stars and many accurate stellar positions, COAST and NPOI producing many very high resolution images, and Infrared Stellar Interferometer measurements of stars in the mid-infrared for the first time. Additional results include direct measurements of the sizes of and distances to Cepheid variable stars, and young stellar objects.

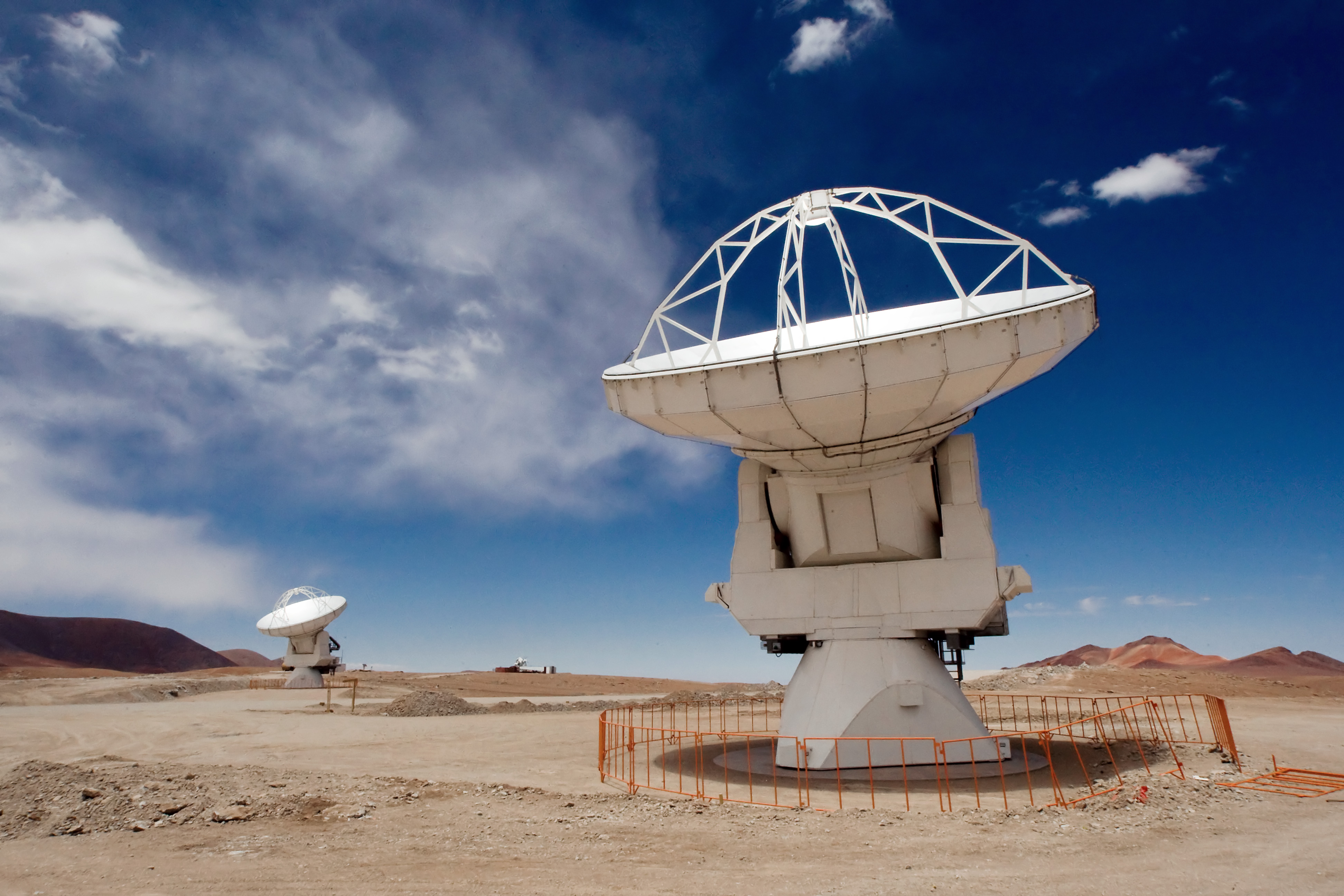
Two of the Atacama Large Millimeter/submillimeter array (ALMA) 12-metre antennas gaze at the sky at the observatory's Array Operations Site (AOS), high on the Chajnantor plateau at an altitude of 5000 metres in the Chilean Andes.

High on the Chajnantor plateau in the Chilean Andes, the European Southern Observatory (ESO), together with its international partners, is building ALMA, which will gather radiation from some of the coldest objects in the Universe. ALMA will be a single telescope of a new design, composed initially of 66 high-precision antennas and operating at wavelengths of 0.3 to 9.6 mm. Its main 12-meter array will have fifty antennas, 12 metres in diameter, acting together as a single telescope – an interferometer. An additional compact array of four 12-metre and twelve 7-meter antennas will complement this. The antennas can be spread across the desert plateau over distances from 150 metres to 16 kilometres, which will give ALMA a powerful variable "zoom". It will be able to probe the Universe at millimetre and submillimetre wavelengths with unprecedented sensitivity and resolution, with a resolution up to ten times greater than the Hubble Space Telescope, and complementing images made with the VLT interferometer.

Optical interferometers are mostly seen by astronomers as very specialized instruments, capable of a very limited range of observations. It is often said that an interferometer achieves the effect of a telescope the size of the distance between the apertures; this is only true in the limited sense of angular resolution. The amount of light gathered—and hence the dimmest object that can be seen—depends on the real aperture size, so an interferometer would offer little improvement as the image is dim (the thinned-array curse). The combined effects of limited aperture area and atmospheric turbulence generally limits interferometers to observations of comparatively bright stars and active galactic nuclei. However, they have proven useful for making very high precision measurements of simple stellar parameters such as size and position (astrometry), for imaging the nearest giant stars and probing the cores of nearby active galaxies.

For details of individual instruments, see the list of astronomical interferometers at visible and infrared wavelengths.

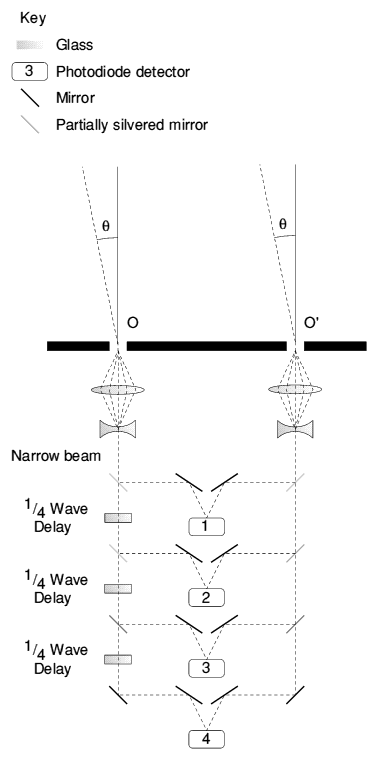
A simple two-element optical interferometer. Light from two small telescopes (shown as lenses) is combined using beam splitters at detectors 1, 2, 3 and 4. The elements creating a 1/4-wave delay in the light allow the phase and amplitude of the interference visibility to be measured, which give information about the shape of the light source.	A single large telescope with an aperture mask over it (labelled Mask), only allowing light through two small holes. The optical paths to detectors 1, 2, 3 and 4 are the same as in the left-hand figure, so this setup will give identical results. By moving the holes in the aperture mask and taking repeated measurements, images can be created using aperture synthesis which would have the same quality as would have been given by the right-hand telescope without the aperture mask. In an analogous way, the same image quality can be achieved by moving the small telescopes around in the left-hand figure — this is the basis of aperture synthesis, using widely separated small telescopes to simulate a giant telescope.

At radio wavelengths, interferometers such as the Very Large Array and MERLIN have been in operation for many years. The distances between telescopes are typically 10–100 km (6.2–62.1 mi), although arrays with much longer baselines utilize the techniques of Very Long Baseline Interferometry. In the (sub)-millimetre, existing arrays include the Submillimeter Array and the IRAM Plateau de Bure facility. The Atacama Large Millimeter Array has been fully operational since March 2013.

Max Tegmark and Matias Zaldarriaga have proposed the Fast Fourier Transform Telescope which would rely on extensive computer power rather than standard lenses and mirrors. If Moore's law continues, such designs may become practical and cheap in a few years.

Progressing quantum computing might eventually allow more extensive use of interferometry, as newer proposals suggest.

== See also ==
- Event Horizon Telescope (EHT) and Laser Interferometer Space Antenna (LISA)
- ExoLife Finder, a proposed hybrid interferometric telescope
- Hypertelescope
- Cambridge Optical Aperture Synthesis Telescope, an optical interferometer
- Navy Precision Optical Interferometer, a Michelson Optical Interferometer
- Radio astronomy § Radio interferometry
- Radio telescope § Radio interferometry

List

- 4C Array
- Akeno Giant Air Shower Array (AGASA)
- Allen Telescope Array (ATA), formerly known as the One Hectare Telescope (1hT)
- Antarctic Muon And Neutrino Detector Array (AMANDA)
- Atacama Large Millimeter Array (ALMA)
- Australia Telescope Compact Array
- CHARA array
- Cherenkov Telescope Array (CTA)
- Chicago Air Shower Array (CASA)
- Infrared Optical Telescope Array (IOTA)
- Interplanetary Scintillation Array (IPS array) also called the Pulsar Array
- LOFAR (LOw Frequency ARray)
- Modular Neutron Array (MoNA)
- Murchison Widefield Array (MWA)
- Northern Extended Millimeter Array (NOEMA)
- Nuclear Spectroscopic Telescope Array (NuSTAR)
- Square Kilometre Array (SKA)
- Submillimeter Array (SMA)
- Sunyaev-Zel'dovich Array (SZA)
- Telescope Array Project
- Very Large Array (VLA)
- Very Long Baseline Array (VLBA)
- Very Small Array
