= Proceedings of SPIE =

- Discipline: Optics
- Language: English

Publication details
- Former name(s): Proceedings of the Society of Photo-Optical Instrumentation Engineers
- History: 1963–present
- Publisher: SPIE

Standard abbreviations
- ISO 4: Proc. SPIE

Indexing
- ISSN: 0277-786X (print); 1996-756X (web)

Links
- Book series homepage; Online archive

Proceedings of SPIE is book series containing the conference record of the Society of Photo-Optical Instrumentation Engineers (SPIE). The first proceedings were published in 1963. As of 2025, the series publishes roughly 16,000 papers in roughly 350 volume per year, totalling over 590,000 papers published in over 13,000 volumes.

== Indexing and abstracting ==
Proceedings of SPIE is indexed and abstracted in:

- Astrophysics Data System
- Chemical Abstracts
- Ei Compendex
- Inspec
- International Aerospace Abstracts
- Index to Scientific & Technical Proceedings
- Physics Abstracts
- Scopus
- SPIN
- Web of Science

According to SCOPUS, it has a CiteScore of 0.5, ranking 149th out of 174 in the category "Instrumentation".
