= Darwin (spacecraft) =

2007 European study concept of an array of space observatories

- Mission type: Interferometric observatory
- Operator: ESA
- Website: www.esa.int/science/darwin

Start of mission
- Rocket: Soyuz-2/Fregat
- Launch site: Kourou ELS
- Contractor: Arianespace

Orbital parameters
- Reference system: Sun–Earth L_{2}
- Regime: Halo orbit
- Epoch: planned

Darwin was a suggested ESA Cornerstone mission which would have involved a constellation of four to nine spacecraft designed to directly detect Earth-like planets orbiting nearby stars and search for evidence of life on these planets. The most recent design envisaged three free-flying space telescopes, each three to four metres in diameter, flying in formation as an astronomical interferometer. These telescopes were to redirect light from distant stars and planets to a fourth spacecraft, which would have contained the beam combiner, spectrometers, and cameras for the interferometer array, and which would have also acted as a communications hub. There was also an earlier design, called the "Robin Laurance configuration," which included six 1.5 metre telescopes, a beam combiner spacecraft, and a separate power and communications spacecraft.

The study of this proposed mission ended in 2007 with no further activities planned. To produce an image, the telescopes would have had to operate in formation with distances between the telescopes controlled to within a few micrometres, and the distance between the telescopes and receiver controlled to within about one nanometre. Several more detailed studies would have been needed to determine whether technology capable of such precision is actually feasible.

== Concept ==
The space telescopes were to observe in the infrared part of the electromagnetic spectrum. As well as studying extrasolar planets, the telescopes would probably have been useful for general purpose imaging, producing very high resolution (i.e. milliarcsecond) infrared images, allowing detailed study of a variety of astrophysical processes.

The infrared region was chosen because in the visible spectrum an Earth-like planet is outshone by its star by a factor of a billion. However, in the infrared, the difference is less by a few orders of magnitude. According to a 2000 ESA bulletin, all spacecraft components in the optical path would have to be passively cooled to 40 kelvins to allow infrared observations to take place.

The planet search would have used a nulling interferometer configuration. In this system, phase shifts would be introduced into the three beams, so that light from the central star would suffer destructive interference and cancel itself out. However, light from any orbiting planets would not cancel out, as the planets are offset slightly from the star's position. This would allow planets to be detected, despite the much brighter signal from the star.

For planet detection, the telescopes would operate in an imaging mode. The detection of an Earth-like planet would require about 10 hours of observation in total, spread out over several months. A 2002 design which would have used 1.5 metre mirrors was expected to take about 100 hours to get a spectrum of a possibly Earth-like planet.

Were the Darwin spacecraft to detect a suitable planet, a more detailed study of its atmosphere would have been made by taking an infrared spectrum of the planet. By analyzing this spectrum, the chemistry of the atmosphere could be determined, and this could provide evidence for life on the planet. The presence of oxygen and water vapour in the atmosphere could be evidence for life. Oxygen is very reactive so if large amounts of oxygen exist in a planet's atmosphere some process such as photosynthesis must be continuously producing it.

The presence of oxygen alone, however, is not conclusive evidence for life. Jupiter's moon Europa, for example, has a tenuous oxygen atmosphere thought to be produced by radiolysis of water molecules. Numerical simulations have shown that under proper conditions it is possible to build up an oxygen atmosphere via photolysis of carbon dioxide. Photolysis of water vapor and carbon dioxide produces hydroxyl ions and atomic oxygen, respectively, and these in turn produce oxygen in small concentrations, with hydrogen escaping into space. When O_{2} is produced by H_{2}O photolysis at high altitude, hydrogenous compounds like H^{+}, OH^{−} and H_{2}O are produced which attack very efficiently O_{3} and prevent its accumulation. The only known way to have a significant amount of O_{3} in the atmosphere is that O_{2} be produced at low altitude, e.g. by biological photosynthesis, and that little H_{2}O gets to high altitudes where UV is present. For terrestrial planets, the simultaneous presence of O_{3}, H_{2}O and CO_{2} in the atmosphere appears to be a reliable biosignature, and the Darwin spacecraft would have been capable of detecting these atmospheric components.

== Candidate planets ==
Planet Gliese 581 d, discovered in 2007, was considered a good candidate for the Darwin project. It orbits within the theoretical habitable zone of its star, and scientists surmise that conditions on the planet might be conducive to supporting life.

== Similar initiatives ==
The interferometric version of NASA's Terrestrial Planet Finder mission is similar in concept to Darwin and also has very similar scientific aims. According to NASA's 2007 budget documentation, released on February 6, 2006, the project was deferred indefinitely, and in June 2011 the project was reported as cancelled. Antoine Labeyrie has proposed a much larger space-based astronomical interferometer similar to Darwin, but with the individual telescopes positioned in a spherical arrangement and with an emphasis on interferometric imaging. This Hypertelescope project would be much more expensive and complex than the Darwin and TPF missions, involving many large free-flying spacecraft.
