= Modular Neutron Array =

Neutron detector located at Michigan university

The Modular Neutron Array (MoNA) is a large-area, high-efficiency neutron detector that is used in basic research of rare isotopes at Michigan State University's National Superconducting Cyclotron Laboratory (NSCL), a nuclear physics research facility. It is specifically designed for detecting neutrons stemming from breakup reactions of fast fragmentation beams.

== Detector array ==
The Modular Neutron Array consists of 144 individual detector modules. Each module is based on a plastic scintillator measuring 10 cm by 10 cm by 200 cm. This scintillator bar is fitted with light guides on each end that direct the light into one photo-multiplier tube on each end. Each detector module is wrapped in a light-tight material, allowing the detector array to be arranged in different configurations.

In its original configuration, MoNA consisted of 9 vertical layers of 16 detectors stacked closely, having an active area of 2.0 m wide by 1.6 m tall. In its current arrangement (depicted in the adjacent image), it is stacked in four separate sections of 2, 2, 2, and 3 layers, respectively, separated by spaces ranging from 0.5 to 0.8 meters. It measures both the position and time of neutron events with multiple-hit capability. The energy of a neutron is based on a time-of-flight measurement. This information together with the detected position of the neutron is used to construct the momentum vector of the neutrons.

The detection efficiency of MoNA is maximized for the high-beam velocities that are available at the NSCL's Coupled Cyclotron Facility (CCF). For neutrons ranging from 50 to 250 MeV in energy, it is designed to have an efficiency of up to 70% and expands the possible coincidence experiments with neutrons to measurements which were previously not feasible. The detector is used in combination with the Sweeper magnet and its focal plane detectors for charged particles. In addition, MoNA's modular design allows it to be transported between experimental vaults and thus to be used in combination with the Sweeper magnet installed at the S800 magnet spectrograph. Due to its high-energy detection efficiency, this detector will be well-suited for experiments with fast fragmentation beams at the proposed ISF.

== History ==
When the NSCL upgraded its capabilities to the Coupled Cyclotron facility, a Florida State University/Michigan State University consortium built the Sweeper magnet to be used with two existing neutron walls to perform neutron–fragment coincidence experiments. The neutron walls were originally built for lower beam energies and had only an efficiency of about 12% for the neutron energies expected from the CCF. During the 2000 NSCL users meeting, a working group realized the opportunity to significantly enhance the efficiency with an array of more layers using plastic scintillator detectors.

Several NSCL users from undergraduate schools were present at the working group meeting and they suggested that the modular nature and simple construction would offer great opportunities to involve undergraduate students.

In the spring of 2001, the idea evolved into several MRI proposals submitted by 10 different institutions, most of them undergraduate schools. Physicists at these ten academic institutions formed the MoNA Collaboration:

- Central Michigan University
- Concordia College at Moorhead
- Florida State University
- Hope College
- Indiana University South Bend
- Marquette University
- Michigan State University
- Wabash College
- Western Michigan University
- Westmont College

The proposals were funded by the NSF in the summer of 2001. Following the detailed design, the first modules of the detector array were delivered in the summer of 2002. During the following year all modules were assembled and tested by undergraduate students at their school, and finally added to form the complete array at the NSCL.

The MoNA collaboration continued after the initial phase of construction and commissioning was concluded [MoNA], and is now using the detector array for experiments, allowing a large number of undergraduate students from all collaborating schools to take part in cutting-edge nuclear physics experiments at one of the world's leading rare-isotope facilities. The research at the undergraduate institutions is funded by the NSF through several RUI (Research at Undergraduate Institutions) grants.

== MoNA Collaboration ==
The MoNA Collaboration currently includes physicists from eleven colleges and universities. The project is funded by the National Science Foundation.

The members of the collaboration are:

- Augustana College (Illinois)
- Central Michigan University
- Concordia College at Moorhead
- Gettysburg College
- Hampton University
- Hope College
- Indiana University South Bend
- Michigan State University
- Ohio Wesleyan University
- Wabash College
- Westmont College

The collaboration is committed to involving undergraduates in significant parts of the experimental program at the MoNA facility. Most of the collaboration member institutions are primarily undergraduate schools. Undergraduates helped construct and test MoNA and continue to participate in experiments during runs and through data analysis. It also created intensive summer sessions designed for undergraduates, encouraging students to participate in all phases of experiments, holding several meetings a year that include undergraduate participants, and employing information technology to bring distant undergraduate students together.
