= PLANETS telescope =

Telescope

Polarized Light from Atmospheres of Nearby ExtraTerrestrial Systems
- Alternative names: PLANETS telescope
- Location(s): Maui, Maui County, Hawaii
- Diameter: 1.85 m (6 ft 1 in)
- Website: www.planets.life/planets-telescope/

The PLANETS telescope (Polarized Light from Atmospheres of Nearby ExtraTerrestrial Systems) is a precursor and technology demonstrator for the Colossus Telescope. It is a single off-axis 1.85 meter telescope, currently under development with 2.6m USD already invested, funded by Tohoku University (Japan), the Institute for Astronomy (Hawaii), the Kiepenheuer Institute (Germany), and National Autonomous University of Mexico. First light was expected in January 2018, and the telescope's proposed location was Haleakalā, a 3000m (10,000ft) volcano on the island of Maui, Hawaii.

== See also ==
- Colossus Telescope
