= Smear Lake =

- Location within Wisconsin
- Location: Bayfield County, Wisconsin
- Coordinates: 46°14′58″N 91°19′18″W
- Type: lake
- Surface area: 9 acres (3.6 ha)
- Max. depth: 4 feet (1.2 m)

Smear Lake is a lake in Bayfield County, Wisconsin, in the United States. A shallow lake with a maximum depth of 4 feet (1.2 m), Smear Lake is 9 acres (3.6 ha) large.

== See also ==
- List of lakes in Wisconsin
