= ExoLife Finder =

Proposed telescope

Adaptive optics

The ExoLife Finder (ELF) telescope is an under-development, hybrid interferometric telescope being designed at the Instituto de Astrofisica de Canarias (IAC) for the direct detection and imaging of exoplanets and potentially water-bearing exoplanets. Developed by a collaboration of scientists and engineers including the PLANETS Foundation, the ELF aims to analyze the surfaces and atmospheres of exoplanets for evidence of life, focusing on nearby star systems within 25 light years of Earth. The telescope's design features non-redundant circular arrays of 5-meter-scale mirrors and tensegrity-based mechanical support with an outer diameter of 35m. It uses multiple layers of advanced atmospheric wavefront sensing and control. It is a scalable optical concept, and could be built within a 10 year timeframe. A 3.5-meter precursor called the Small ELF (SELF) is currently being built in the Canary Islands. The ELF's first targets will include nearby stars cooler than the Sun.

ELF incorporates several new technologies in order to study exoplanets that could be 100 million times fainter than the stars they orbit. This combination of technologies results in smoother and lighter optics compared to conventional telescope mirrors and greater control of optical diffraction and wavefront errors created by the atmosphere. According to the team behind ELF, the telescope's imaging capabilities and detection methods, which include analyzing planetary energy signatures and spectroscopic chemical fingerprints, will advance our understanding of exoplanetary environments and the search for extraterrestrial life.

== The Small ELF (SELF) ==
The Small ExoLife Finder (SELF) telescope is a 3.5m outer diameter Fizeau telescope built from 15 0.5m diameter subapertures arranged in a circular pattern like the ELF telescope. SELF uses a telescope support structure built from a tensegrity structure of cables and compressional elements. This structure creates a stiff basis for the optics that can be 10 times lighter than a conventional truss structure. The subapertures are aligned and carefully phased using a small secondary mirror for each of the 15 subapertures. Machine learning algorithms and photonic structures built into the optical system allow the SELF to overcome the effects of the atmosphere to suppress the bright central starlight in order to see the exoplanetary environment around nearby bright stars.

== Laboratory for Innovation in OptoMechanics (LIOM) ==
The key to finding life is to measure reflected starlight from an exoplanet. ELF does this with a very large diameter telescope using optical technologies that can measure and correct the distortions in the optical wavefront created by the atmosphere above the telescope and the telescope's imperfections. The ELF depends on 4 innovations: 1) new ways of creating accurate light-weight large mirrors without grinding glass, 2) a scalable optical system that combines elements of conventional telescopes with interferometry, 3) new ways of precisely supporting optics without massive mechanical trusses, and 4) photonics and machine learning innovations to measure and correct the stellar wavefront. IAC hosts the Laboratory for Innovation in OptoMechanics (LIOM) where scientists, engineers, and students are working on solving all of these problems.

== Design and specifications ==
The ExoLife Finder (ELF) is a specialized large telescope designed for exoplanetary research, with an ultimate focus on detecting the energy signatures of life or its optical fingerprints on nearby exoplanets. The ELF is effectively a Fizeau interferometer that links an array of diffraction-limited unobscured off-axis subaperture telescopes at a common Gregorian focus. The direct detection of exoplanetary light relies on an extremely large telescope aperture with superior control of diffraction and correction of atmospheric wavefront distortions. The ELF's basic design consists of circular arrays of 5-meter-scale mirrors, utilizing thin curvature-polished technology, resulting in a total diameter of about 35 meters. This size allows the ELF to "image" dozens of exoplanets within 25 light years of Earth, opening a new window onto exoplanetary science and the search for extraterrestrial life.

Cost is highly dependent on system mass and the ELF employs a structural principle called tensegrity which utilizes actively controlled tension and compression to greatly reduce weight. Tensegrity is often used in bridge designs but the term originated with Buckminster Fuller 50 years ago. Each of the ELF's mirrors has a dedicated secondary off-axis mirror. Off-axis telescopes are often used in radio dish receivers, but their usage in optical telescopes has been made possible by new polishing technology. This design reduces scattered light that might interfere with the faint optical signal received from exoplanets.

The ELF is intended to be scalable, affordable, and rapidly buildable within a decade timeframe. Its unusual design allows the telescope to achieve the sensitivity needed to reconstruct images of exoplanets, making it the earliest and most cost-effective path forward for finding and characterizing life on nearby exoplanets.

=== Mirror technology ===
One of the key innovations of the ELF telescope is its mirror technology, which significantly differs from that of traditional telescopes that are descended from the abrasive glass shaping concept pioneered by Isaac Newton 500 years ago. Such traditional telescope mirrors are several centimeters thick and can require many 10's of cycles of rubbing and measuring to achieve a high quality optical surface. Large optical mirrors like these typically cost $0.5M per m^{2}. The combination of curvature polishing and tensegrity support structures can reduce the cost and time to fabricate large telescope optics by more than an order of magnitude. Dynamically maintaining the shape of such thin mirrors against gravity direction changes and wind forces is done with 3D printed electroactive polymers.

=== Imaging and detection capabilities ===
ELF is designed to indirectly image the surface of exoplanets and to detect the energy signatures and spectroscopic chemical fingerprints that are indicative of life. The telescope's primary focus is on detecting molecules such as water, oxygen, methane, carbon dioxide, and ozone, which are commonly associated with life on Earth. Additionally, the ELF is capable of detecting photosynthetic bio-pigments on the surface of exoplanets, which could indicate the presence of photosynthetic organisms.

The ELF's useful imaging capabilities extend up to 120 trillion miles, or 24 light years, away from Earth with a particular sensitivity for exoplanets around stars cooler than the Sun. This range allows it to target dozens of exoplanets within 25 light years of the Solar System, including the nearby star system Alpha Centauri, which holds promising worlds like Proxima B in the habitable zone.

To achieve its imaging and detection goals, the ELF utilizes the so-called vortex nulling properties of its Fizeau interferometry. These optics create what is called a coronagraph from the telescope primary optics alone. The use of complex inversion algorithms that depend on repeated observations of the exoplanet systems over months then samples the exoplanetary rotation and orbit to reveal details of its surface structure like oceans, continents, forests, deserts, or even city complexes.

== Location ==
The precursor small ELF is locate on Mt. Teide on Tenerife island and the proposed location for the full ELF telescope could be in the Canary Islands for seeing the Northern sky or in Chile's Atacama Desert to see southern exoplanets like Proxima B. The remote and dry environment of the Atacama Desert provides optimal conditions for astronomical observations, while minimizing light pollution and atmospheric disturbances.
