= Malcolm Fridlund =

Swedish astronomer (born 1952)

Malcolm Carl Wilhelm Fridlund (born 1952), is a Swedish astronomer. He wrote his doctoral thesis 1987 in astronomy at Stockholm University and works since 1988 on ESA in Noordwijk in the Netherlands as scientific project manager. Since 1996 Malcolm Fridlund is the scientific manager of the Darwin project. From the spring of 2006 he was also ESA project manager for the international COROT-project.
