= Apep (disambiguation) =

Apep is a god in Ancient Egyptian mythology.

Apep or APEP may also refer to:

- Apep (star system), a triple star system
- APEP FC, a football club based in Kyperounta, Cyprus
- APEP Pelendriou, a football club based in Pelendriou, Cyprus
