= Peter Tuthill =

Peter Tuthill may refer to:

- Peter Tuthill (astronomer) (born 1967)
- Peter Tuthill (musician), band member of Carnal Forge
