= Peter Tuthill (astronomer) =

Australian astronomer

Peter G. Tuthill
- Born: 18 January 1967 (age 59); Sydney, Australia
- Education: Churchill College, Cambridge
- Alma mater: University of Queensland, Australian National University
- Known for: Aperture Masking Interferometry, Sydney University Stellar Interferometer
- Awards: Eureka Prize for Scientific Research
- Scientific career
- Fields: Physics; Astronomy
- Workplaces: University of Sydney, University of California, Berkeley
- Doctoral advisor: John E. Baldwin

Peter G. Tuthill (born 18 Jan 1967) is an Australian astronomer who has pioneered the science of high-angular resolution astronomy, leading the development of aperture masking interferometry and astronomical optical interferometry. He is a professor of astrophysics at the School of Physics at the University of Sydney and was Director of the Sydney Institute for Astronomy (SIfA) of School from 2010 to 2015.

== Early life and education ==
Tuthill was born in Sydney in 1967, and grew up in Warwick, Queensland. He attended the University of Queensland for an undergraduate degree in physics and ANU for Honours, before a PhD at Churchill College, Cambridge on the Cambridge Optical Aperture Synthesis Telescope. He won a Lindemann Trust Fellowship to do postdoctoral research at the University of California, Berkeley under Nobel Laureate Charles H. Townes, working on the Keck Aperture Masking Experiment. He returned to Australia to the University of Sydney, holding a succession of Fellowships: the U2000 Postdoctoral Fellowship (1999), ARC Australian Research Fellowship (2002), ARC QE II Research Fellowship (2007), and the ARC Future Fellowship (2010).

== Wolf-Rayet Stars ==
Using the Keck Aperture Masking Experiment, Tuthill for the first time revealed pinwheel nebulae around Wolf–Rayet stars, formed by winds colliding with their binary companions. The most spectacular of these have been conjectured as gamma-ray burst progenitors in the Milky Way: WR 104 and the only known Galactic Wolf-Rayet binary Apep.

== Sydney University Stellar Interferometer ==
Tuthill directed the Sydney University Stellar Interferometer (SUSI) at Narrabri, New South Wales from 2006 until its closure in 2017.

== TOLIMAN Space Telescope ==
Tuthill is the director of the proposed TOLIMAN Space Telescope, funded by the Breakthrough Prize Foundation to search for planets around alpha Centauri AB by astrometry.

== Awards and honours ==
- Eureka Prize for Scientific Research, 2005
- 2014 CISRA/Canon Extreme Imaging Award, II jointly to Paul Stewart and Peter Tuthill
- 2013 CISRA/Canon Extreme Imaging Award, jointly to Barnaby Norris and Peter Tuthill

== See also ==
- Aperture Masking Interferometry
- Sydney University Stellar Interferometer
- Wolf-Rayet Pinwheels: Apep, WR 104
