= Paul Wild =

Paul Wild may refer to:

- Paul Wild (Australian scientist) (1923–2008), British-born Australian scientist
  - Paul Wild Observatory in Narrabri, Australia
- Paul Wild (Swiss astronomer) (1925–2014)
