= Kernel-phase =

Kernel-phases are observable quantities used in high resolution astronomical imaging used for superresolution image creation. It can be seen as a generalization of closure phases for redundant arrays. For this reason, when the wavefront quality requirement are met, it is an alternative to aperture masking interferometry that can be executed without a mask while retaining phase error rejection properties. The observables are computed through linear algebra from the Fourier transform of direct images. They can then be used for statistical testing, model fitting, or image reconstruction.

== Prerequisites ==
In order to extract kernel-phases from an image, some requirements must be met:

- Images are nyquist-sampled (at least 2 pixels per resolution element ($\frac{\lambda}{D}$))
- Images are taken in near monochromatic light
- Exposure time is shorter than the timescale of aberrations
- Strehl ratio is high (good adaptive optics)
- Linearity of the pixel response (i.e. no saturation)

Deviations from these requirements are known to be acceptable, but lead to observational bias that should be corrected by the observation of calibrators.

== Definition ==
The method relies on a discrete model of the instrument's pupil plane and the corresponding list of baselines to provide corresponding vectors $\varphi$ of pupil plane errors and $\Phi$ of image plane Fourier Phases. When the wavefront error in the pupil plane is small enough (i.e. when the Strehl ratio of the imaging system is sufficiently high), the complex amplitude associated to the instrumental phase in one point of the pupil $\varphi_k$, can be approximated by $e^{i\varphi_k} \approx 1 + \mathit{i}\varphi_{k}$ . This permits the expression of the pupil-plane phase aberrations $\varphi$ to the image plane Fourier phase as a linear transformation described by the matrix $A$:

$$\Phi = \Phi_0 + A \cdot \varphi$$

Where $\Phi_0$ is the theoretical Fourier phase vector of the object. In this formalism, singular value decomposition can be used to find a matrix $K$ satisfying $K \cdot A=0$. The rows of $K$ constitute a basis of the kernel of $A^{T}$.

$$K \cdot \Phi = K \cdot \Phi_0 + \cancel{K \cdot A \cdot \varphi}$$

The vector $K.\Phi$ is called the kernel-phase vector of observables. This equation can be used for model-fitting as it represents the interpretation of a sub-space of the Fourier phase that is immune to the instrumental phase errors to the first order.

== Applications ==
The technique was first used in the re-analysis of archival images from the Hubble Space Telescope where it enabled the discovery of a number of brown dwarf in close binary systems.

The technique is used as an alternative to aperture masking interferometry, especially for fainter stars because it does not require the use of masks that typically block 90% of the light, and therefore allows higher throughput. It is also considered to be an alternative to coronagraphy for direct detection of exoplanets at very small separations (below $2\frac{\lambda}{D}$) where coronagraphs are limited by the wavefront errors of adaptive optics.

The same framework can be used for wavefront sensing. In the case of an asymmetric aperture, a pseudo-inverse of $A$ can be used to reconstruct the wavefront errors directly from the image.

A Python library called xara is available on GitHub and maintained by Frantz Martinache to facilitate the extraction and interpretation of kernel-phases.

The KERNEL project, has received funding from the European Research Council to explore the potential of these observables for a number of use-cases, including direct detection of exoplanets, image reconstruction, and image plane wavefront sensing for adaptive optics.
