= Apep (star system) =

Triple-star system in the constellation Norma

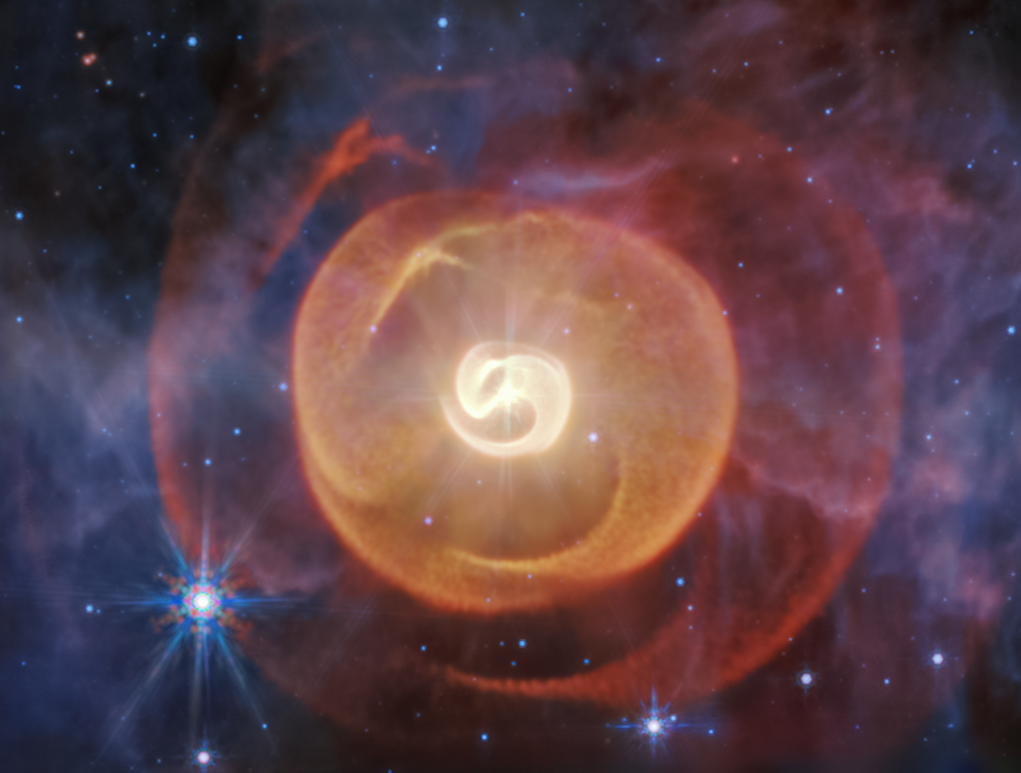
- JWST MIRI image of Apep Star System

Observation data Epoch J2000.0 Equinox ICRS
- Constellation: Norma
- Right ascension: 16^{h} 00^{m} 50.5^{s}
- Declination: −51° 42′ 45″
- Apparent magnitude (V): 17.5

Characteristics
- Evolutionary stage: WR binary
- Spectral type: WC8+WN4-6b+OIaf
- Apparent magnitude (J): 10.2
- Apparent magnitude (K): 6.9

Astrometry
Distance	4,600+500 −1,800 pc 2,000+400 −300 pc
Absolute magnitude (M_{V})	-5.15 / -5.15 / -7.4

Orbit
Primary	Apep A
Secondary	Apep B
Period (P)	193 ±11 yr
Eccentricity (e)	0.82 ±0.04
Inclination (i)	24 ±3°
Longitude of the node (Ω)	164 ±15°
Argument of periastron (ω) (secondary)	10 ±10°

Other designations
- WR 70-16, 2MASS J16005047-5142449

Database references
SIMBAD	data

Apep is a triple star system containing a Wolf–Rayet binary and a hot supergiant, located in the constellation of Norma. Named after the serpent deity from Egyptian mythology, the star system is surrounded by a vast complex of stellar wind and cosmic dust thrown into space by the high rotation speed of the binary's primary star and formed into a "pinwheel" shape by the secondary star's influence. Ground-based studies of the system in the 2010s concluded that the system was the best-known gamma-ray burst progenitor candidate in the Milky Way galaxy.

== Nomenclature ==
Apep, pronounced /ˈɑːpɛp/, was named by a team of astronomers led by Joseph Callingham of ASTRON, who studied the system between 2016 and 2018 and published a scientific paper on their observations. It was named after the mortal enemy of the sun god Ra in Egyptian mythology, who was often illustrated as a giant serpent; their rivalry was described as "an apt allusion" to the appearance of the system and its stellar wind in infrared as "a star embattled within a dragon's coils". In the XMM-Newton Serendipitous Source Catalogue (2XMM), a star catalog of X-ray sources observed by the XMM-Newton space telescope, the system is catalogued as 2XMM J160050.7−514245. It is also known as WR 70–16.

== Characteristics ==
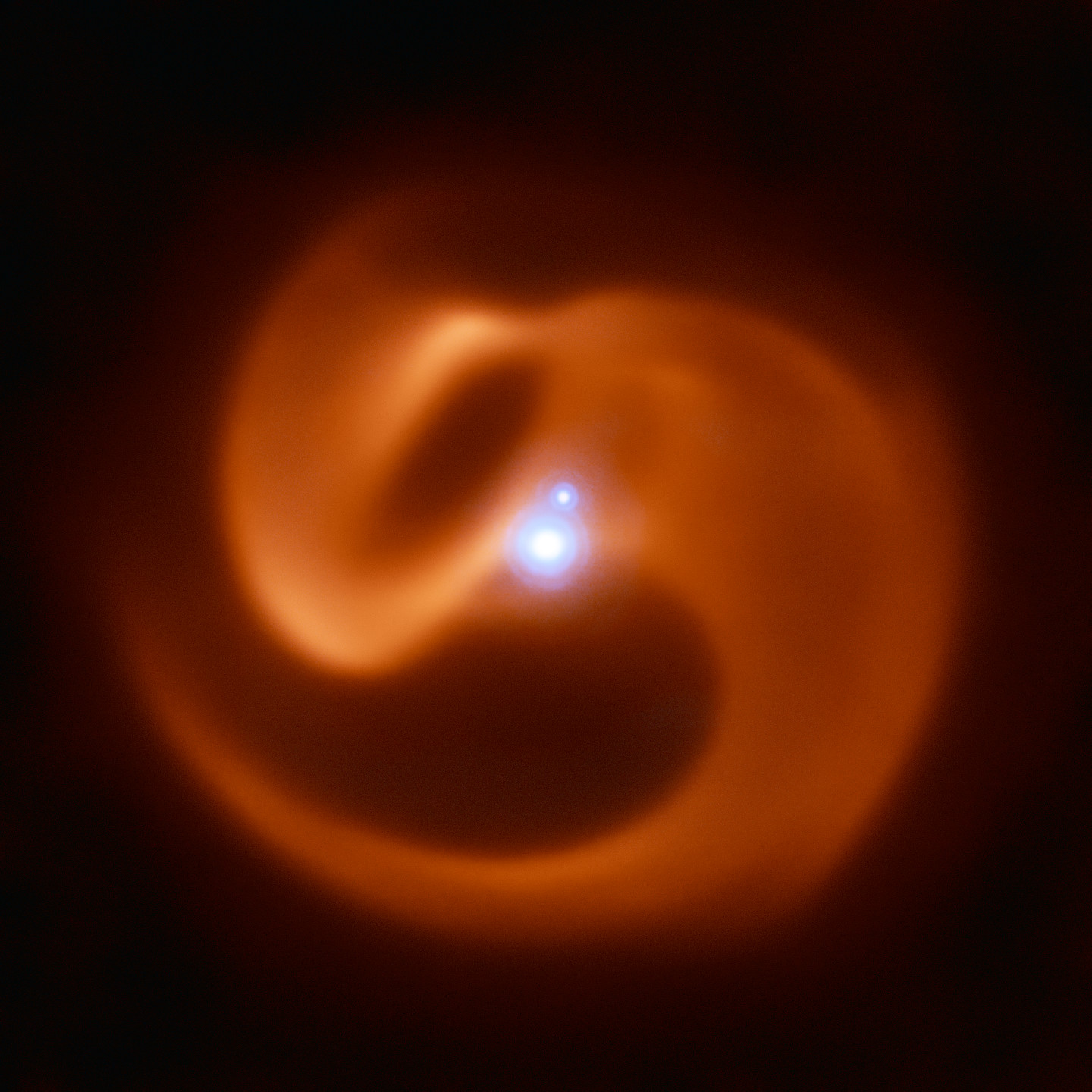
Infrared image by the Very Large Telescope (ESO/Callingham et al.) (Note: A composite of two infrared images taken by the European Southern Observatory's Very Large Telescope on 13 August 2016 – one of the stars in the center of the system taken by the NACO instrument in a wavelength of 2.24 micrometres, and one of the surrounding dust and gas cloud taken by the VISIR instrument in a wavelength of 8.9 micrometers. The image measures 0.26 × 0.26 arcminutes across.)

Apep is a triple star system containing a Wolf–Rayet binary described as the "central engine", orbiting with a period of ~100 years, and a third hot supergiant star described as the "northern companion", orbiting the central engine at a distance of ~1,700 astronomical units and a period of >10,000 years. This outer companion was shown to carve a cavity into the dust shell, confirming that it is physically bound to the inner binary. The binary at the centre of Apep is composed of two classical Wolf–Rayet stars of carbon- (WC8) and nitrogen-sequence (WN4-6b) subtypes, making Apep the strongest case of a classical WR+WR binary system in the Milky Way. Carbon-sequence Wolf–Rayet stars are often dust-making factories. A vast complex of stellar wind and cosmic dust surrounds the system, resembling WR 104, another Wolf–Rayet star system producing a pinwheel nebula. The wind, travelling at a velocity of 12 million km/h (7.5 million mph), and dust travelling at 2 million km/h (1.2 million mph) at the edge of the system, suggest that at least one component of the central engine is rapidly rotating, so that its surface gravity is close to being balanced by its centrifugal force outwards. This component produces faster stellar winds from its poles and slower winds from its equator, and the equatorial wind's interaction with the wind of its secondary produces the system's "pinwheel" shape. Rapidly rotating Wolf–Rayet stars are theoretically capable of producing a gamma-ray burst during a supernova, and the system has been identified as a progenitor for a gamma-ray burst. Apep is estimated to be at a distance of ~2.4 kiloparsecs, or ~8,000 light-years, from Earth, with a potential discrepancy of +0.2 and −0.5 kiloparsecs at its estimated visual extinction of 11.4.

== Observation ==
Location of Apep in Norma (circled)

Apep is located in the constellation of Norma, at a right ascension of 16^{h} 00^{m} 50.5^{s} and declination of −51° 42′ 45″, The system can be resolved into two components, the "central engine" Wolf–Rayet binary, and the "northern companion" supergiant. The total apparent magnitude of the system is 17.5, with the apparent magnitude of a resolved central engine and northern companion being 19.0 and 17.8 respectively. Its infrared spectral energy distribution (SED) is unique, with brightness ranging from an apparent magnitude of 6.4 at 2.2 μm to −2.4 at 22 μm. Surveys conducted with the European Southern Observatory (ESO)'s SINFONI instrument on the Very Large Telescope measured the apparent magnitude in the infrared J band for the central engine as 10.2±0.2, and for the northern companion as 9.6±0.2. SINFONI also measured the apparent magnitude of the system in the K band as 6.9±0.2 for the central engine and 8.1±0.2 for C, in the L band as 4.7±0.1 for the central engine and 7.3±0.1 for the northern companion, and in the M band as 4.4±0.3 for the central engine and 7.0±0.2 for the northern companion. SINFONI observations further detailed that the northern companion is possibly a conventional B1Ia^{+} high-luminosity star. A and B show a typical spectrum from a WC7 star, but with additional WN4 or WN5 star features theorised to be from one of the stars of the central engine; if confirmed, this would make Apep a rare binary system of WR stars. An alternative hypothesis also based on SINFONI data proposes that the spectra could all be from an unusual transitional WN/WC star, and that the northern companion would then be a conventional OB star. Combining the spectra of the WR stars EZ Canis Majoris and WR 90 would produce a spectrum almost identical to the one observed of the WR binary.

The system was the first gamma-ray burst progenitor candidate to be discovered in the Milky Way galaxy, although it had not been known as such in early observations, such as those with the XMM-Newton and Chandra space telescopes, where it had been identified simply as an X-ray source as early as August 2004. Astronomer Joe Callingham first observed Apep during undergraduate studies at the University of Sydney with the Molonglo Observatory Synthesis Telescope, and was noted as a potential colliding-wind binary, with a radio source as bright as Eta Carinae. Callingham and Peter Tuthill, who led the discovery of WR 104 in 1998 and sought interest in Apep after observing its extreme infrared properties, used the ESO's Very Large Telescope for observations in August 2016. Further observations with the Anglo-Australian Telescope and the Australia Telescope Compact Array, along with contributions from various international institutions, (Note: Contributions from the University of Edinburgh, the University of New South Wales, New York University, and the University of Sheffield, and the University of Sydney.) led to the publication of a scientific paper in Nature Astronomy on 19 November 2018. It concluded that the system was a Wolf–Rayet binary and a progenitor for a gamma-ray burst. It had been previously assumed that such systems were only found in galaxies younger than the Milky Way.

JWST Mid-Infrared Instrument observations were published in 2025. The observations showed the outer shells. The observed dust structure was produced over the last 700 years and the dust shell is expanding with a speed of 90±4 mas/yr.

== See also ==
- List of gamma-ray bursts
