= John E. Baldwin =

British astronomer

John E. Baldwin FRS
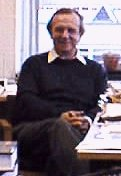
- Baldwin in the Cavendish Laboratory
- Born: 6 December 1931; Liverpool, England
- Died: 7 December 2010 (aged 79)
- Education: Queens' College, Cambridge
- Known for: Cambridge Optical Aperture Synthesis Telescope; Aperture Masking Interferometry
- Spouse: Joyce Cox
- Awards: Jackson-Gwilt Medal
- Scientific career
- Fields: Astronomy
- Thesis: A study of cosmic radio sources of large angular size (1956)
- Doctoral advisor: Martin Ryle
- Doctoral students: David Saint-Jacques, Peter Tuthill

John Evan Baldwin FRS (6 December 1931 – 7 December 2010) was a British astronomer who worked at the Cavendish Astrophysics Group (formerly Mullard Radio Astronomy Observatory) from 1954. He played a role in the development of interferometry in Radio Astronomy, and later astronomical optical interferometry and lucky imaging. He made the first maps of the radio emission from the Andromeda Galaxy and the Perseus Cluster, and measured the properties of many active galaxies. In 1985 he performed the first Aperture Masking Interferometry observations, and then led the construction and operation of the Cambridge Optical Aperture Synthesis Telescope, and helped develop the lucky imaging method. In 2001 he was awarded the Jackson-Gwilt Medal for his technical contributions to the fields of interferometry and aperture synthesis.

He matriculated as a member of Queens' College, Cambridge in 1949 and was a Life Fellow of the College from 1999 to his death in 2010.
