= Closure phase =

Observable quantity in imaging astronomical interferometry

The closure phase is an observable quantity in imaging astronomical interferometry, which allowed the use of interferometry with very long baselines. It forms the basis of the self-calibration approach to interferometric imaging. The observable which is usually used in most "closure phase" observations is actually the complex quantity called the triple product (or bispectrum). The closure phase is the phase (argument) of this complex quantity.

== History ==
Roger Jennison developed this novel technique for obtaining information about visibility phases in an interferometer when delay errors are present. Although his initial laboratory measurements of closure phase had been done at optical wavelengths, he foresaw greater potential for his technique in radio interferometry. In 1958 he demonstrated its effectiveness with a radio interferometer, but it became widely used for long baseline radio interferometry only in 1974. A minimum of three antennas are required. This method was used for the first VLBI measurements, and a modified form of this approach ("Self-Calibration") is still used today. The "closure-phase" or "self-calibration" methods are also used to eliminate the effects of astronomical seeing in optical and infrared observations using astronomical interferometers.

== Definition ==
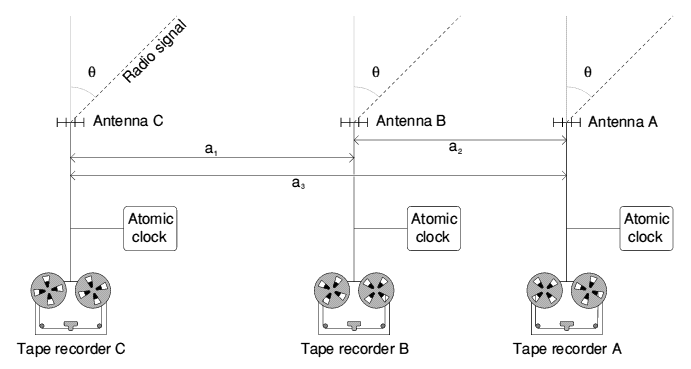
Three radio telescope receivers.

A minimum of three antennas are required for closure phase measurements. In the simplest case, with three antennas in a line separated by the distances a_{1} and a_{2} shown in diagram at the right. The radio signals received are recorded onto magnetic tapes and sent to a laboratory such as the Very Long Baseline Array. The effective baselines for a source at an angle $\theta$ will be $x_{1}=a_{1}\cos\theta$, $x_{2}=a_{2}\cos\theta$, and $x_{3}=(a_{1}+a_{2})\cos\theta$. When one mixes signals from two of antennas (compensating for a delay for the angle $\theta_{0}$) one observes interference signal with phase $x(\theta)-x(\theta_{0}).$ Taking into account that signals may come from several sources, the complex interference signal is the Fourier transform $P$ of the power density of the sources.

The phases of the complex visibility of the radio source corresponding to baselines a_{1}, a_{2} and a_{3} are denoted by $\phi_{1}$, $\phi_{2}$ and $\phi_{3}$ respectively. These phases will contain errors resulting from ε_{B} and ε_{C} in the signal phases. The measured phases for baselines x_{1}, x_{2} and x_{3}, denoted $\psi_{1}$, $\psi_{2}$ and $\psi_{3}$, will be:

$$\psi_{1}= \phi_{1}+e_{B}-e_{C}$$

$$\psi_{2}= \phi_{2}-e_{B}$$

$$\psi_{3}= \phi_{3}-e_{C}$$

Jennison defined his observable O (now called the closure phase) for the three antennas as:

$$O = \psi_{1}+ \psi_{2}- \psi_{3}$$

As the error terms cancel:

$$O = \phi_{1}+ \phi_{2}- \phi_{3}$$

The closure phase is unaffected by phase errors at any of the antennas. Because of this property, it is widely used for aperture synthesis imaging in astronomical interferometry. For a point source, $O$ is 0; so $O$ carries information on the spatial distribution of the source. While $|P(x)|$ may be measured directly, and the phase of $P(x)$ cannot be found from 2-antennas VLBI, using 3 antennas one can find the phase of $P(x_{1})P(x_{2})P^{*}(x_{1}+x_{2}).$

In most real observations, the complex visibilities are actually multiplied together to form the triple product instead of simply summing the visibility phases. The phase of the triple product is the closure phase.

In optical interferometry, the closure phase was first introduced by the bispectrum speckle interferometry, the principle of which is to compute the closure phase from the complex measurement instead of the phase itself:

$$B_{123}= C_{12} C_{23} C_{13}^{*}$$

The closure phase is then computed as the argument of this bispectrum:

$$O = arg(B_{123})$$

This method of computation is robust to noise and allow to perform averaging even if the noise dominates the phase signal.

Example: even when power distribution of the source is symmetric, so $P(x)$ is real, measuring $|P(x)|$ still leaves the signs unknown. The closure phase allows finding the sign of $P(x_{1}+x_{2})$ when signs of $P(x_{1})$, $P(x_{2})$ are known. Since $P(x)$ is positive for small $x$, one can fully map how the sign changes, and calculate $P(x)$.

== Single telescope applications ==
Aperture masks are often used on single telescopes to allow the extraction of closure phases from the images. Kernel-phases can be seen as a generalization of closure phase for redundant arrays in cases where the wavefront errors are low enough.
