= Sydney University Stellar Interferometer =

Long baseline interferometer

- Alternative names: SUSI
- Location: New South Wales, AUS
- Coordinates: 30°19′15″S 149°32′58″E
- Website: web.archive.org/web/20090116003318/http://www.physics.usyd.edu.au:80/sifa/Main/SUSI
- Location within Australia

The Sydney University Stellar Interferometer (SUSI) was an optical long baseline interferometer owned by The University of Sydney. It was located in the Paul Wild Observatory, 20 km west of Narrabri town in New South Wales, Australia. SUSI was initially proposed by Australian astronomer John Davis in 1985, who led the project through to completion in 1993 and past his retirement in 1996 until his death in 2010. From then until its closure in 2017 it was led by Peter Tuthill, and used as a test facility for instruments for the CHARA Array.

The interferometer had several siderostats, which collected and reflected starlight into the optical laboratory for interferometry via two vacuum pipes. Although mirrors at the siderostats were 20 cm in diameter, the effective aperture size was 14 cm as they operated at angles of about 45°. By selecting the different siderostats at different distances, the baseline of the interferometer could be varied between 5m and 640m.

With beam-combining instruments that operated at visible wavelengths (~550-850 nm), SUSI had an angular resolution of up to ~0.7mas (milliarcseconds).
