= WR 104 =

Triple star system in the constellation Sagittarius

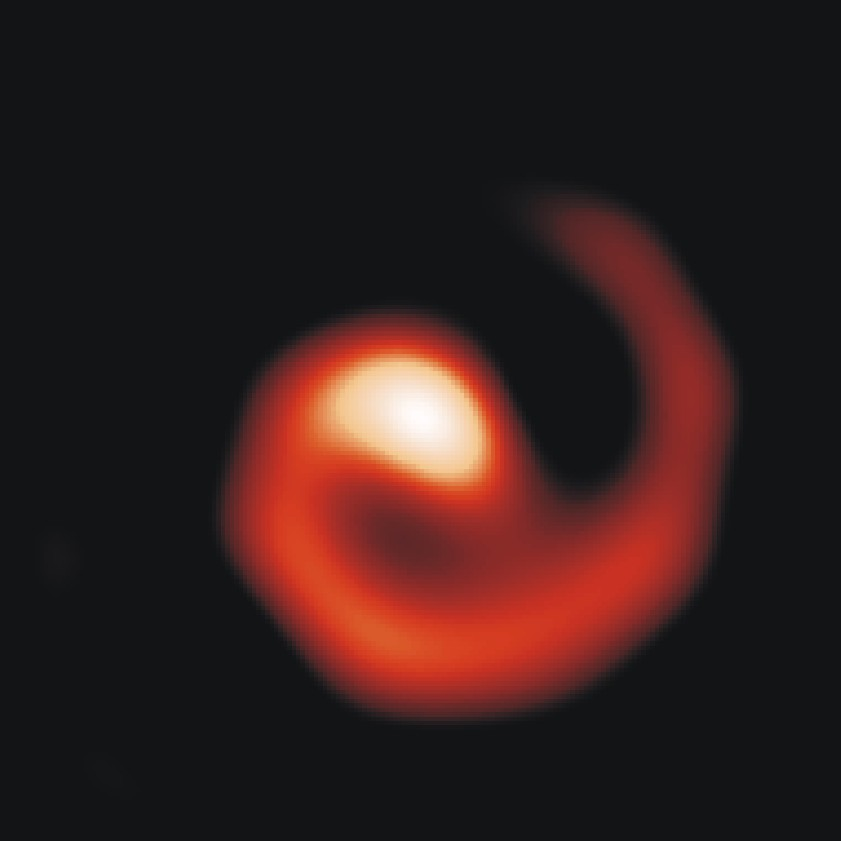
- WR 104

Observation data Epoch J2000 Equinox ICRS
- Constellation: Sagittarius
- Right ascension: 18^{h} 02^{m} 04.07^{s}
- Declination: −23° 37′ 41.2″
- Apparent magnitude (V): 13.28 (12.7 - 14.6) + 15.36

Characteristics
- Evolutionary stage: Wolf–Rayet
- Spectral type: WC9d + O6V + O8V–O5V

Astrometry
Proper motion (μ)	RA: 0.161 mas/yr Dec.: −1.827 mas/yr
Parallax (π)	0.2431±0.0988 mas
Distance	2,580±120 pc
Absolute magnitude (M_{V})	−5.4 (−4.8 + −4.6)

Orbit
Period (P)	241.54±0.14 days
Semi-major axis (a)	2.34 AU
Eccentricity (e)	0.04±0.03
Inclination (i)	41.8+13.0 −14.9°

Details

WR
Mass	14.9+28.9 −6.6 M_{☉}
Radius	6 R_{☉}
Luminosity	120,000 L_{☉}
Temperature	45,000 K
Age	7 Myr

OB
Mass	40+78 −18 M_{☉}
Radius	13.5 R_{☉}
Luminosity	140,000 L_{☉}
Temperature	30,000 K
Age	7 Myr

B
Radius	7.98 (Note: Applying the Stefan–Boltzmann law with a nominal solar effective temperature of 5,772 K: $$\sqrt{(5772/33000)^4 * 68,000} = 7.978\ R\odot$$) R_{☉}
Luminosity	68,000 L_{☉}
Temperature	≥33,000 K
Age	7 Myr

Other designations
- V5097 Sgr, IRAS 17590−2337, UCAC2 22296214, CSI−23-17590, IRC −20417, RAFGL 2048, MSX6C G006.4432−00.4858, Ve 2-45

Database references
SIMBAD	data

WR 104 is a triple star system located about 2,580 parsecs (8,400 ly) from Earth. The primary star is a Wolf–Rayet star (abbreviated as WR), which has a B0.5 main sequence star in close orbit and another more distant fainter companion.

The WR star is surrounded by a distinctive spiral Wolf–Rayet nebula, often referred to as a pinwheel nebula. The rotational axis of the binary system, and likely of the two closest stars, is directed approximately towards Earth. Within the next few hundred thousand years, the Wolf–Rayet star is predicted to experience a core-collapse supernova with a small chance of producing a long-duration gamma-ray burst.

The possibility of a supernova explosion from WR 104 having destructive consequences for life on Earth stirred interest in the mass media, and several popular science articles have been issued in the press since 2008. Some articles decide to reject the catastrophic scenario, while others leave it as an open question.

== System ==
The Wolf–Rayet star that produces the characteristic emission line spectrum of WR 104 has a resolved companion and an unresolved spectroscopic companion, forming a triple system.

The spectroscopic pair consists of the Wolf–Rayet star and a B0.5 main sequence star. The WR star is visually 0.3 magnitudes fainter than the main sequence star, although the WR star is typically considered the primary, as it dominates the appearance of the spectrum and is more luminous. The two are in a nearly circular orbit separated by about 2 AU, which would be about one milli-arcsecond at the assumed distance. The two stars orbit every 241.5 days with a small inclination (i.e. nearly face-on).

The visually resolved companion is 1.5 magnitudes fainter than the combined spectroscopic pair and almost one arc-second away. It is thought to be physically associated, although orbital motion has not been observed. From the colour and brightness, it is expected to be a hot main sequence star.

== Structure ==
The rotational axis of the binary system is directed approximately towards Earth at an estimated inclination of 0 to 16 degrees. This provides a fortunate viewing angle for observing the binary system and its dynamics.

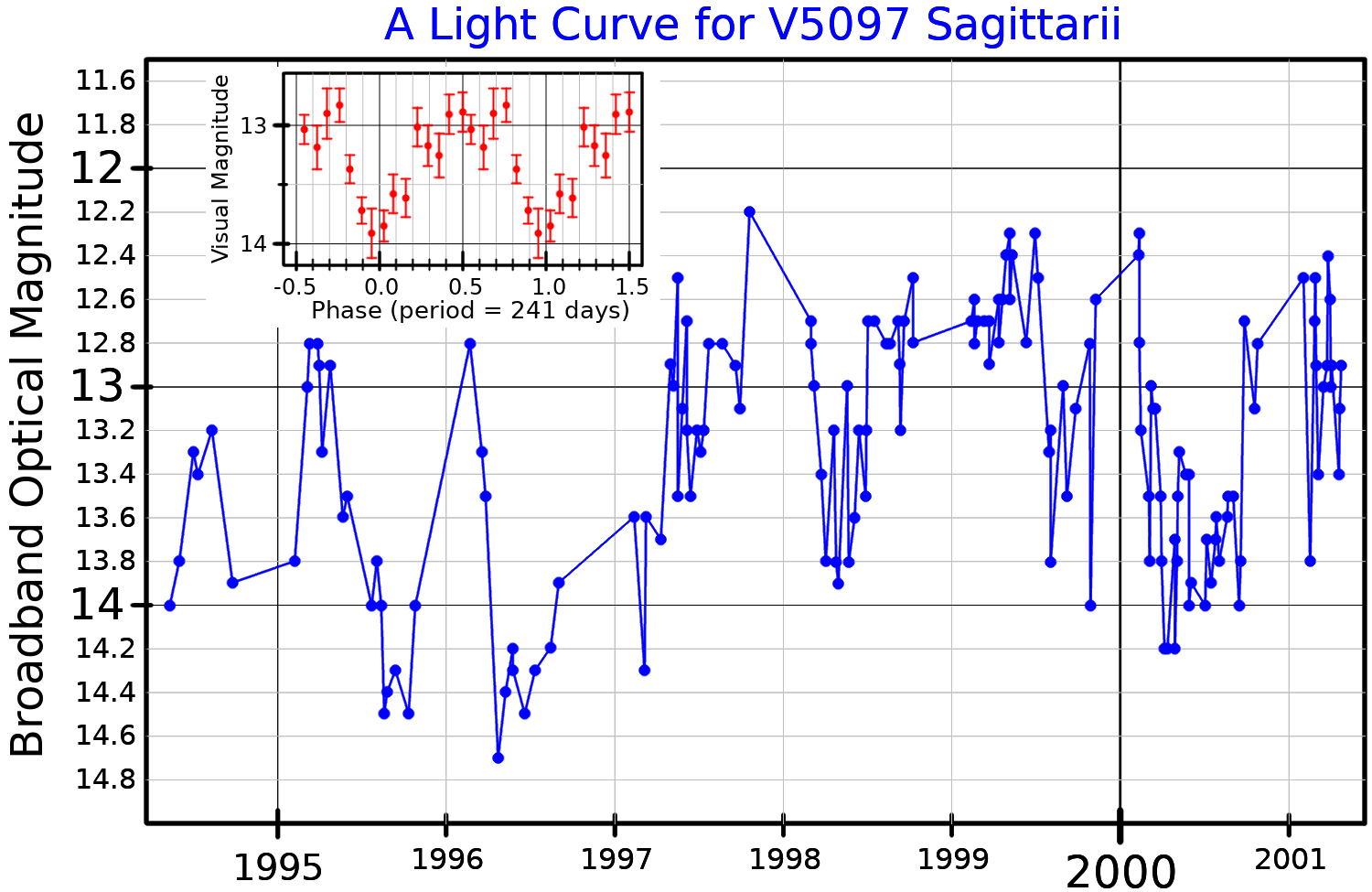
Broadband optical and visual band light curves for V5097 Sagittarii. The main plot shows the long-term variability and the inset plot shows the periodic variability. Adapted from Kato et al. (2002)

Discovered as part of the Keck Aperture Masking Experiment WR 104 is surrounded by a distinctive dusty Wolf–Rayet nebula over 200 astronomical units in diameter formed by interaction between the stellar winds of the two stars as they rotate and orbit. The spiral appearance of the nebula has led to the name Pinwheel Nebula being used. The spiral structure of the nebula is composed of dust that would be prevented from forming by WR 104's intense radiation were it not for the star's companion. The region where the stellar wind from the two massive stars interacts compresses the material enough for the dust to form, and the rotation of the system causes the spiral-shaped pattern. The round appearance of the spiral leads to the conclusion that the system is seen almost pole on, and an almost circular orbital period of 220 days had been assumed from the pinwheel outflow pattern.

Photometric variability of the star was reported by Paul A. Crowther, in 1997. Large amplitude quasi-periodic variability was reported by Taichi Kato et al. in 2002. For that reason it was given its variable star designation, V5097 Sagittarii, in 2003. WR 104 shows frequent eclipse events as well as other irregular variations in brightness. The undisturbed apparent magnitude is around 12.7, but the star is rarely at that level. The eclipses are believed to be caused by dust formed from expelled material, not by the companion star.

== Supernova progenitor ==
Both stars in the WR 104 system are predicted to end their days as core-collapse supernovae. The Wolf–Rayet star is in the final phase of its life cycle and is expected to turn into a supernova much sooner than the OB star. It is predicted to occur at some point within the next few hundred thousand years. With the relatively close proximity to the Solar System, the question of whether WR 104 will pose a future danger to life on Earth has been raised.

=== Gamma-ray burst ===
Apart from a core-collapse supernova, astrophysicists have speculated about whether WR 104 has the potential to cause a gamma-ray burst (GRB) at the end of its life. The companion OB star certainly has the potential, but the Wolf–Rayet star is likely to go supernova much sooner. There remain too many uncertainties and unknown parameters for any reliable prediction, and only sketchy estimates of a GRB scenario for WR 104 have been published.

Wolf–Rayet stars with a sufficiently high spin velocity, prior to going supernova, could produce a long duration gamma ray burst, beaming high energy radiation along its rotational axis in two oppositely directed relativistic jets. Presently, mechanisms for the generation of GRB emissions are not fully understood, but it is considered that there is a small chance that the Wolf–Rayet component of WR 104 may become one when it goes supernova.

=== Effects on Earth ===
According to available astrophysical data for both WR 104 and its companion, eventually both stars will finally be destroyed as highly directional anisotropic supernovae, producing concentrated radiative emissions as narrow relativistic jets. Theoretical studies of such supernovae suggest jet formation aligns with the rotational axes of its progenitor star and its eventual stellar remnant, and will preferentially eject matter along their polar axes.

If these jets happen to be aimed towards the Solar System, its consequences could significantly harm life on Earth and its biosphere, whose true impact depends on the amount of radiation received, the number of energetic particles and the source's distance. Knowing that the inclination of the binary system containing WR 104 is roughly 12° relative to line of sight, and assuming both stars have their rotational axes similarly orientated, suggests some potential risk. Recent studies suggest these effects pose a "highly unlikely" danger to life on Earth, with which, as stated by Australian astronomer Peter Tuthill, the Wolf–Rayet star would have to undergo an extraordinary string of successive events:

1. The Wolf–Rayet star would have to generate a gamma-ray burst (GRB); however, these events are mostly associated with galaxies with a low metallicity and have not yet been observed in our Milky Way Galaxy. Some astronomers believe it unlikely that WR 104 will generate a GRB; Tuthill tentatively estimates the probability for any kind of GRB event is around the level of one percent, but cautions more research is needed to be confident.
2. The rotational axis of the Wolf–Rayet star would have to be pointed in the direction of Earth. The star's axis is estimated to be close to the axis of the binary orbit of WR 104. Observations of the spiral plume are consistent with an orbital pole angle of anywhere from 0 to 16 degrees relative to the Earth, but a spectrographic observation suggest a significantly larger and therefore less dangerous angle of 30°–40° (possibly as much as 45°). Estimates of the "opening angle" jet's arc currently range from 2 to 20 degrees. (Note: The "opening angle" is the total angular span of the jet, not the angular span from the axis to one side. Earth would therefore only be in the intersecting path if the actual angle of the star's axis relative to Earth is less than half the opening angle.)
3. The jet would have to reach far enough in order to damage life on Earth. The narrower the jet appears, the farther it will reach, but the less likely it is to hit Earth.
