= Pinwheel nebula =

Astronomical object

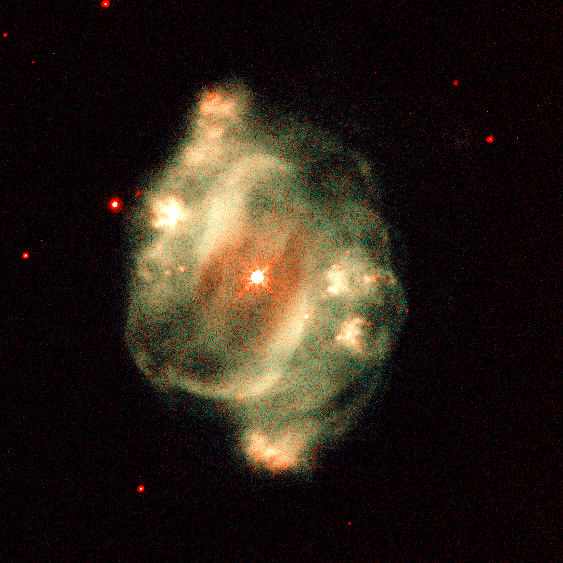
NGC 5307 is an example of a pinwheel nebula.

A pinwheel nebula is a class of Wolf–Rayet nebula in the shape of a pinwheel.

== Wolf–Rayet nebulae ==
Animation of WR 104's pinwheel nebula

Some Wolf–Rayet stars are surrounded by pinwheel nebulae. These nebulae are formed from the dust that is spewed out of a binary star system. The stellar winds of the two stars collide and form two dust lanes that spiral outward with the rotation of the system.

The first such nebula, located around WR 104, was discovered using the Keck Observatory in 1999. The discovery of a second, WR 98a, established pinwheel nebulae as a distinct class of nebula.

== Pinwheel Galaxy ==
M101, better known as the Pinwheel Galaxy, was historically known as the Pinwheel Nebula before Edwin Hubble realized that many spiral shaped nebulae were actually 'island universes' or what we now call galaxies.
