= Paul Wild Observatory =

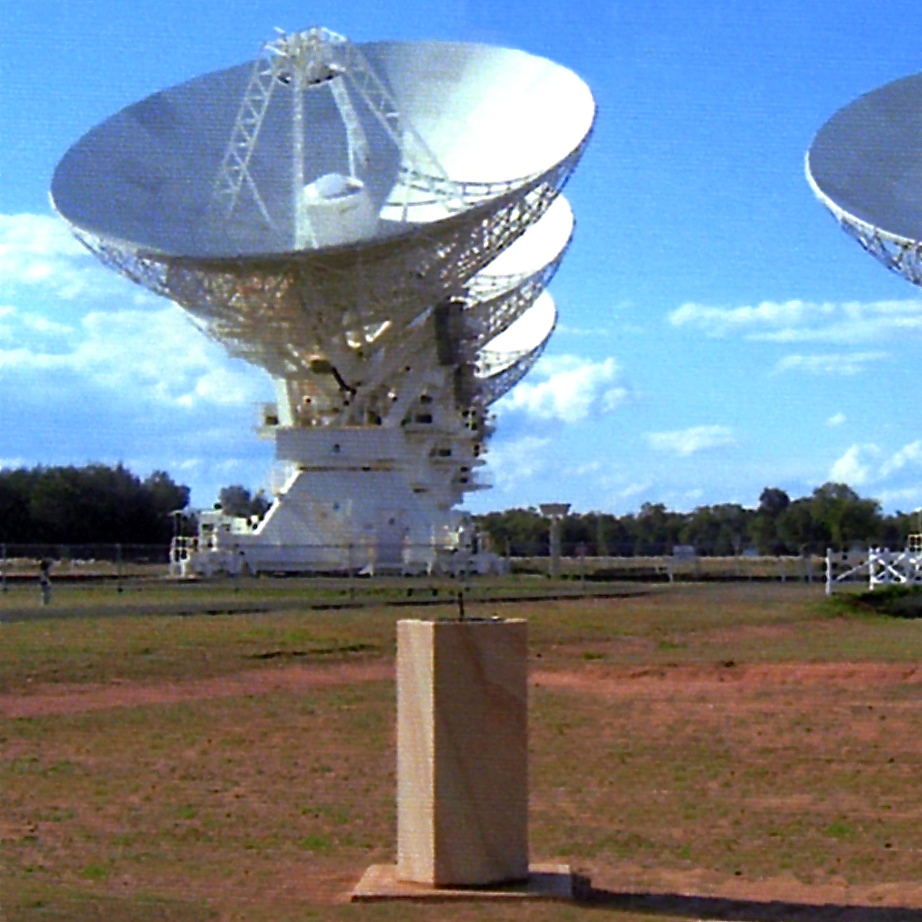
- Alternative names: Narrabri Observatory
- Named after: Paul Wild
- Location: Narrabri, New South Wales, Australia
- Coordinates: 30°18′50″S 149°33′43″E
- Website: www.csiro.au/en/Locations/NSW/Narrabri
- Telescopes: Australia Telescope Compact Array; Sydney University Stellar Interferometer
- Location of Paul Wild Observatory

The Paul Wild Observatory, also known as the Narrabri Observatory and Culgoora Observatory, is an astronomical research facility located about 24 km west of Narrabri, New South Wales, Australia. It is the home of the Australia Telescope Compact Array, and the Culgoora Solar Observatory.

The site itself and the Australia Telescope Compact Array are run by Australia's science agency, the CSIRO. The current Solar Observatory is run by the Space Weather Services section of the Bureau of Meteorology.

The site is named in honour of Australian radio astronomer Paul Wild, who headed the team that built the instrument that the site was established for – the Culgoora Radioheliograph, the world's first radioheliograph – which ran from 1967 to 1984.

The Australia Telescope Compact Array began operating at the site in 1988.

== Current facilities ==
- The Australia Telescope Compact Array – a six-dish radio telescope interferometer
- The Ionospheric Prediction Service (Space Weather Services) Culgoora Solar Observatory
- A node of the Birmingham Solar Oscillations Network (BiSON)
- An element of the Magnetic Data Acquisition System (MAGDAS) global magnetometer array
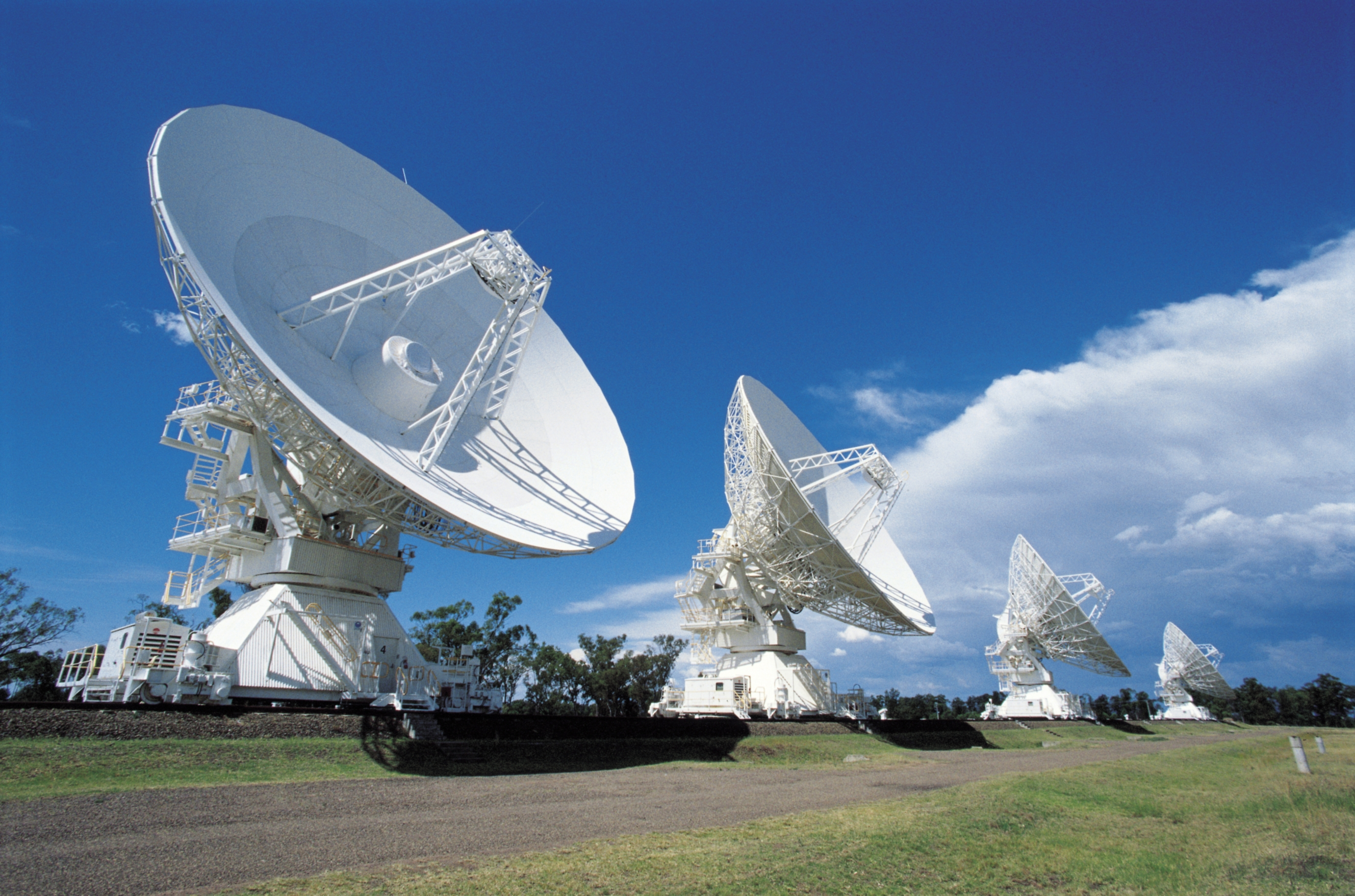
Four antenna dishes of the compact array

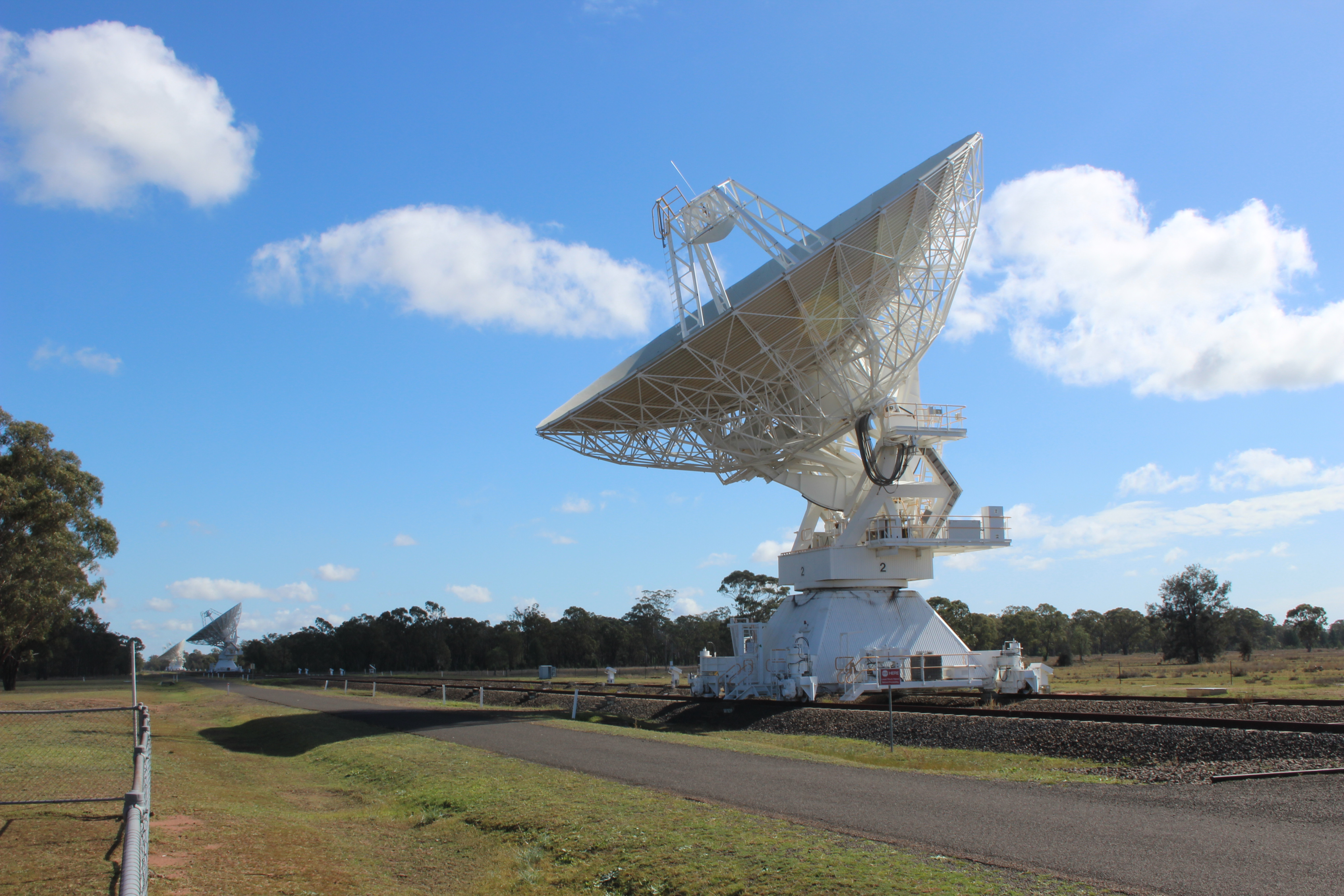
Dishes of the Compact Array, showing track

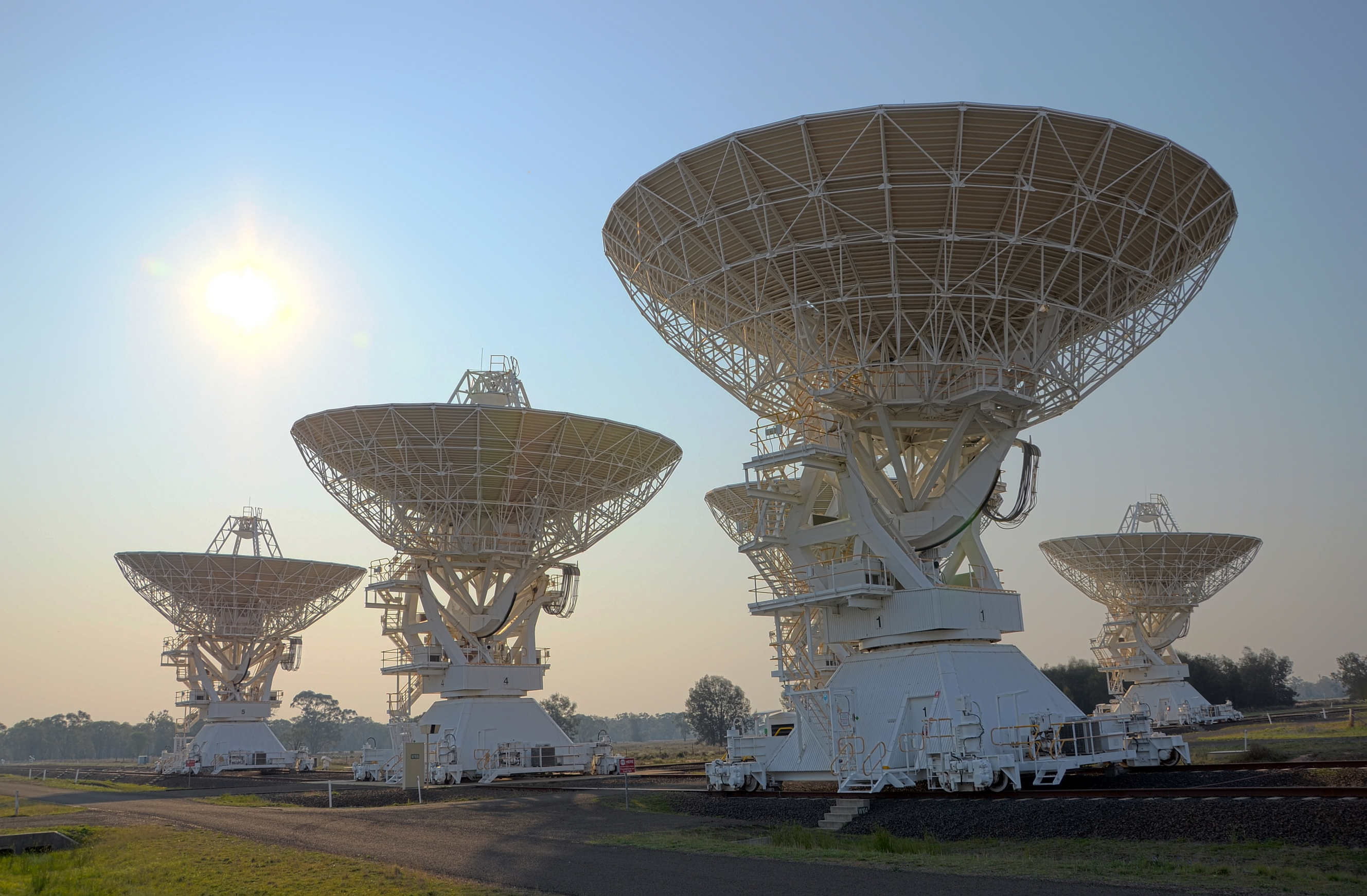
A compact arrangement of dishes, at the north spur junction

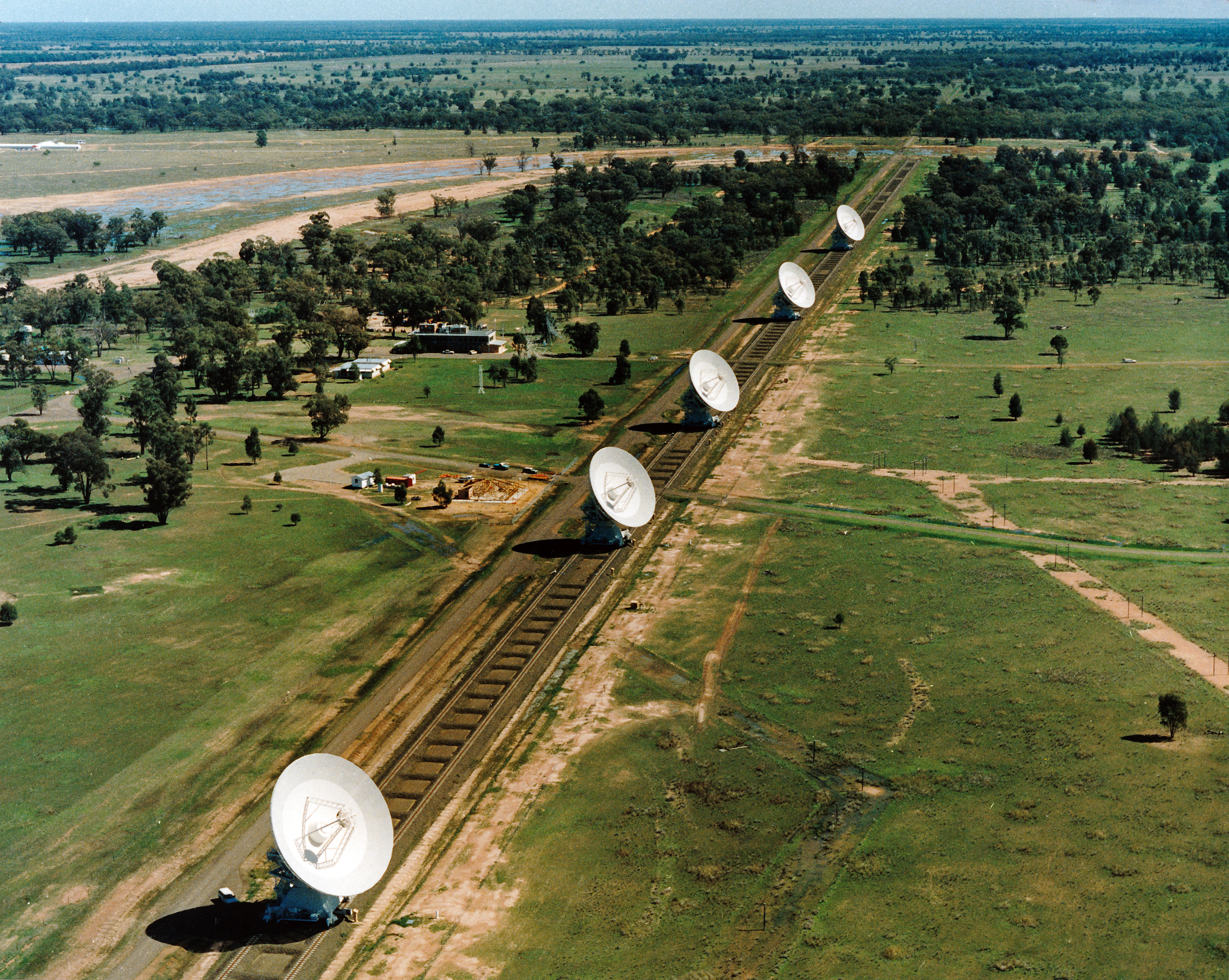
East-west track of Array, before construction of north spur. 6th dish in far distance

== Past facilities ==
- Culgoora Radioheliograph
- CSIRO Culgoora Solar Observatory
- Sydney University Stellar Interferometer
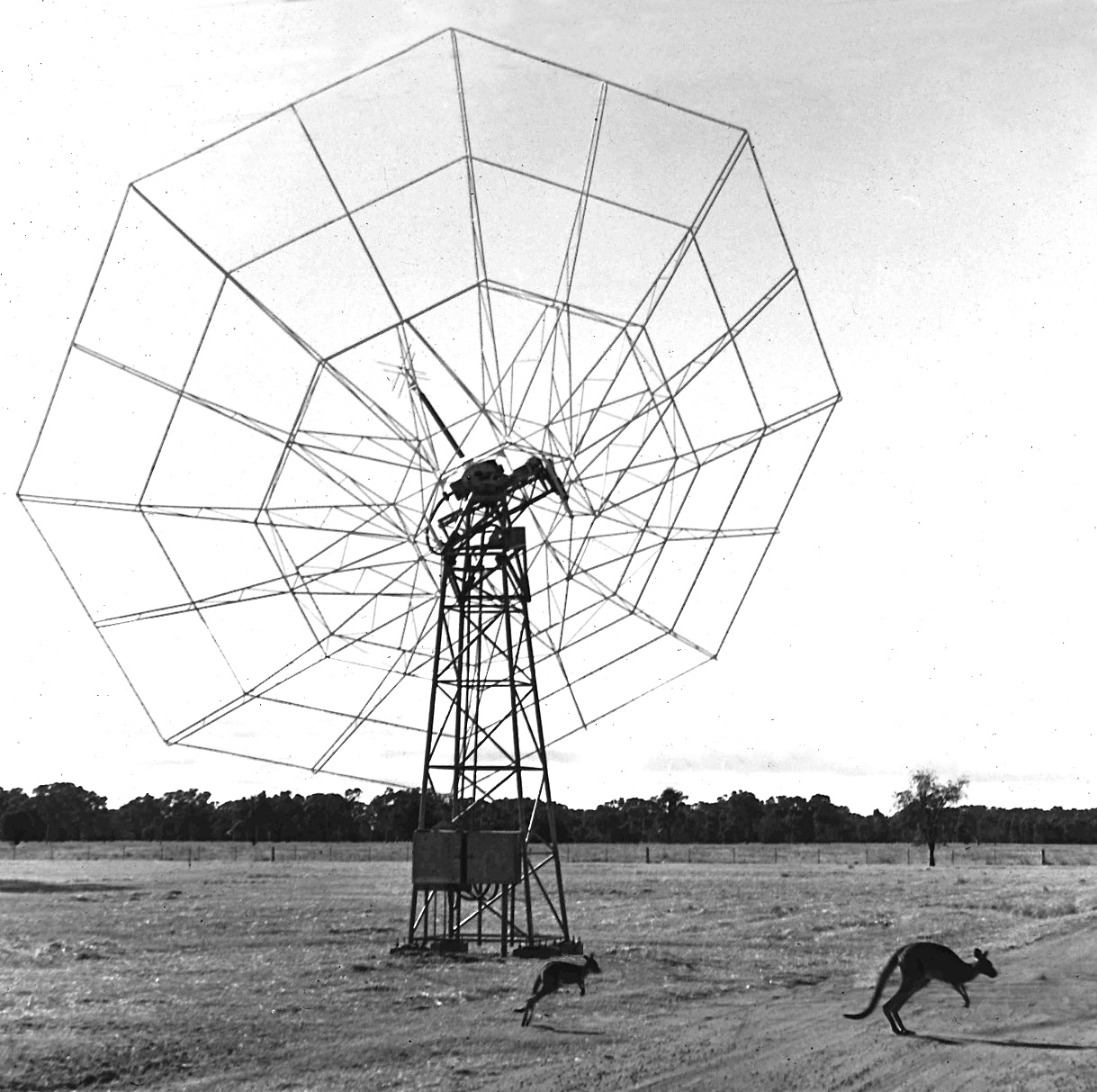
An Antenna of Culgoora Radioheliograph, 1970s

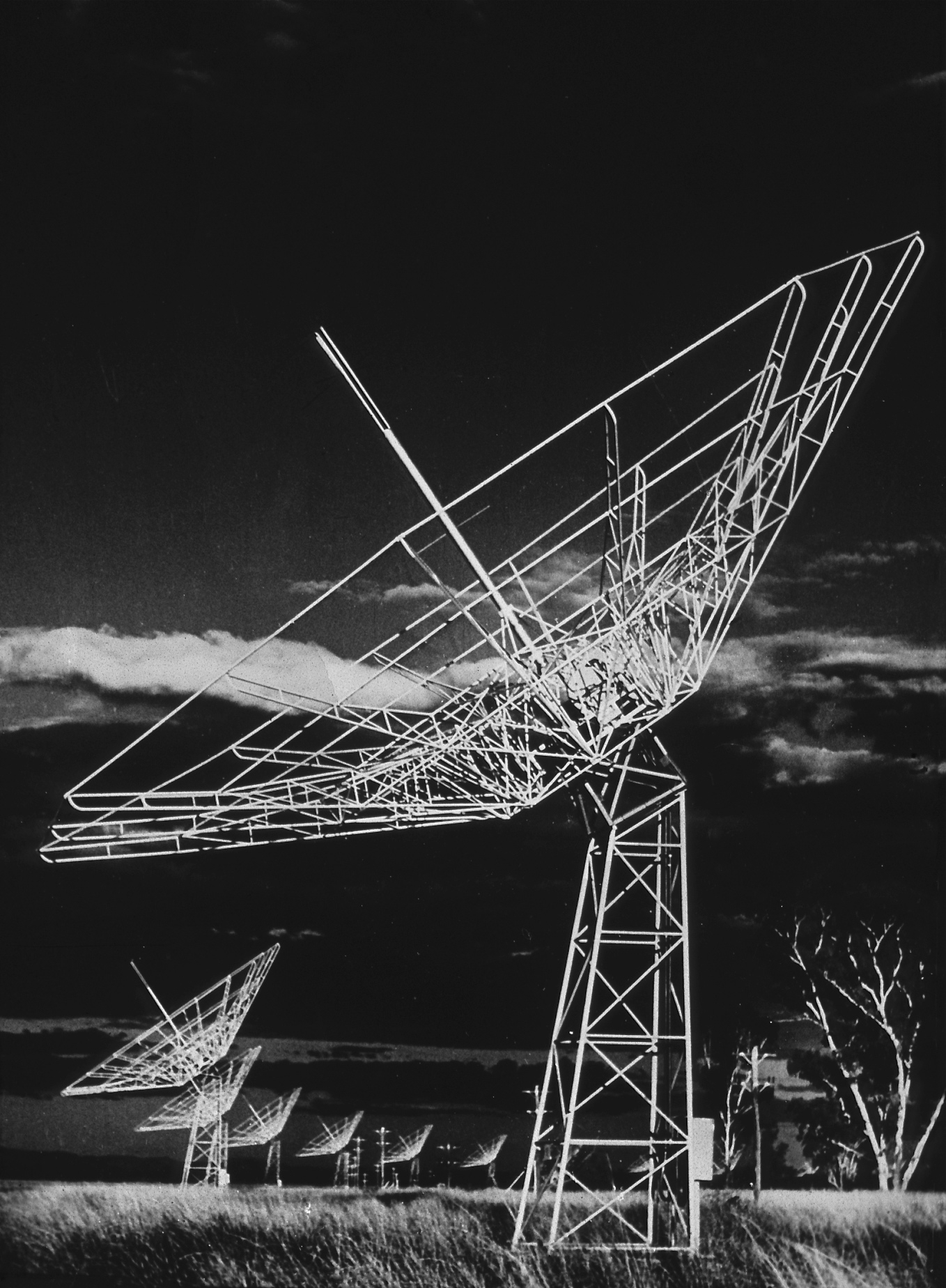
7 of the 96 Antennae of Radioheliograph, c.1968

== In the media ==
The children's/teen's television adventure series Sky Trackers was filmed at the site in 1993, with the antenna dishes of the Australia Telescope Compact Array being prominently featured.

== Other sites nearby ==
In addition to the Paul Wild Observatory, there is a history of astronomical research at other sites in the Narrabri area. The Narrabri Stellar Intensity Interferometer, the predecessor of SUSI, was located about 10 km north of Narrabri.

At a site south of Narrabri, near the Bohena Creek, Durham University ran gamma ray telescopes from 1986 to 2000. The Bohena Creek site had previously been used for Sydney University's Giant Air Shower Recorder (SUGAR) for the detection of cosmic rays.

== See also ==
- List of radio telescopes
