= Apophis =

Ancient Egyptian deity

- Personification of Chaos and Darkness
- A depiction of Apophis based on the depiction in the tomb of Ramesses I.
Name in hieroglyphs
O29 p p I14
- Original pronunciation: Apep
- Abode: Duat
- Symbol: Snake
- Enemy: Ra
- Texts: Book of the Dead
- Gender: Male

Genealogy
- Parents: None Neith (in some myths)
- Siblings: None Ra (in some myths), Sobek (in some myths)

Apophis (/ə.ˈpɒ.fɪs/; from Ancient Greek: Ἄποφις, romanized: Ápophis), also known as Apep (Ancient Egyptian: 𓉻𓐰𓊪𓐱𓊪𓆙, romanized: ꜥꜣpp) or Aphoph (/ə.ˈfɒf/, Coptic: Ⲁⲫⲱⲫ, romanized: Aphōph) is the ancient Egyptian deity of chaos, darkness and fire, and is thus the opponent of light and Maat (order/truth). Ra was the bringer of light and hence the greatest opposer of Apophis, who was usually depicted as a giant snake or serpent.

== Features ==
Because Ra was the solar deity, bringer of light, and thus the upholder of Maat, Apophis was viewed as the greatest enemy of Ra, and thus was given the title Enemy of Ra, and also "the Lord of Chaos".

"The Lord of Chaos" was usually depicted as a giant snake or serpent leading to such titles as Serpent from the Nile and Evil Dragon. Some descriptions said that he stretched 16 yards in length and had a head made of flint.

One of the earliest depictions of Apophis is a painting on the rim of a C-ware bowl from the Naqada I culture (c. 4000–3550 BC) (now in Cairo), which depicts the figure of a large snake, in the company of other desert and aquatic animals, and positions it in opposition to a deity, probably solar, who occupies a large boat with oars. This is most likely Ra, or an early version of Ra, and the snake is most likely Apophis.

The few descriptions of the origin of Apophis in myth usually demonstrate that it was born after Ra, usually from his umbilical cord. Geraldine Pinch claims that a much later creation myth explained that, "Apophis sprang from the saliva of the goddess Neith when she was still in the primeval waters. Her spit became a snake 120 yards long." But Apophis was also commonly believed to have existed from the beginning of time in the waters of Nu of primeval chaos.

== Battles with Ra ==
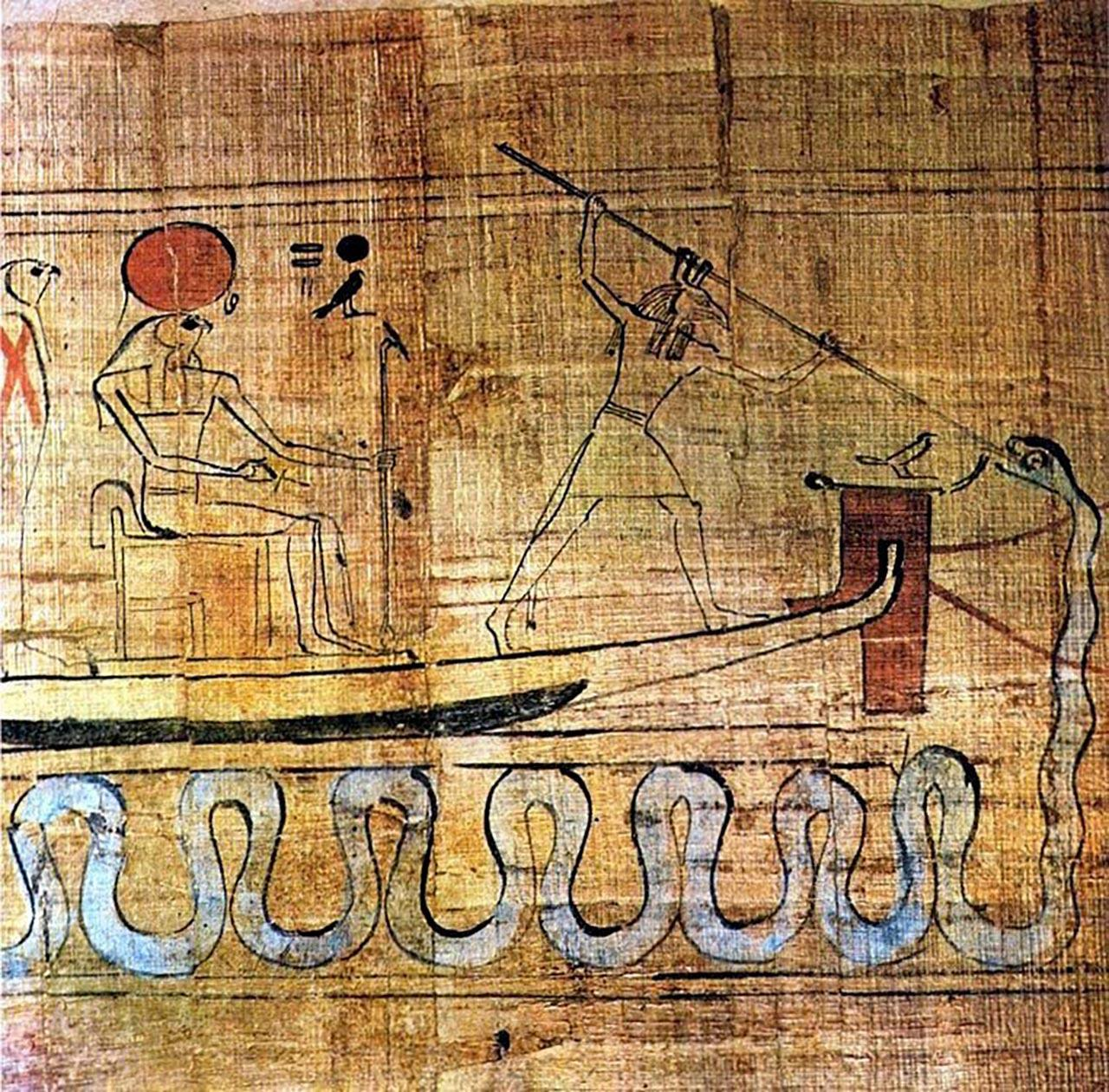
Set spearing the snake Apophis (Egyptian Museum, Cairo)

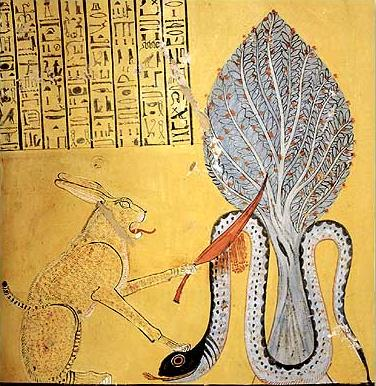
The sun god Ra, in the form of Great Cat, slays the snake Apophis

Tales of Apophis battles against Ra were elaborated during the New Kingdom. Storytellers said that every day Apophis must lie below the horizon and not persist in the mortal kingdom. This appropriately made him a part of the underworld. In some stories, Apophis waited for Ra in a western mountain called Manu, where the sun set, and in others, Apophis lurked just before dawn, in the Tenth region of the Night. The wide range of Apophis's possible locations gained him the title World-Encircler. It was thought that his terrifying roar would cause the underworld to rumble. Myths sometimes say that Apophis was trapped there, because he had been the previous chief god overthrown by Ra, or because he was evil and had been imprisoned.

The Coffin Texts imply that Apophis used a magical gaze to overwhelm Ra and his entourage. Ra was assisted by a number of defenders who travelled with him, including Set and possibly the Eye of Ra. Apophis' movements were thought to cause earthquakes, and his battles with Set may have been meant to explain the origin of thunderstorms. In one account, Ra himself defeats Apophis in the form of a cat.

== Religious practices ==
Ra's victory each night was thought to be ensured by the prayers of the Egyptian priests and worshippers at temples. The Egyptians practiced a number of rituals and superstitions that were thought to ward off Apophis and to aid Ra in continuing his journey across the sky.

In an annual rite called the Ritual of Overthrowing Apophis, priests would build an effigy of Apophis that was thought to contain all of the evil and darkness in Egypt, and burn it to protect everyone from Apophis' evil for another year.

The Egyptian priests had a detailed guide to fighting Apophis, referred to as The Books of Overthrowing Apep (or the Book of Apophis, in Greek). The chapters described a gradual process of dishonoring, dismemberment, and disposal, which include:

- Spitting Upon Apophis
- Defiling Apophis with the Left Foot
- Taking a Lance to Smite Apophis
- Fettering Apophis
- Taking a Knife to Smite Apophis
- Putting Fire Upon Apophis

In addition to stories about Ra's victories, this guide had instructions for making wax models, or small drawings, of the serpent, which would be spat on, mutilated and burnt, whilst reciting spells that would aid Ra in killing Apophis. Fearing that even the image of Apophis could give power to the demon, any rendering would always include another deity to subdue the monster.

As Apophis was thought to live in the underworld, he was sometimes thought of as an Eater of Souls. Thus the dead also needed protection, so they were sometimes buried with spells that could destroy Apophis . The Book of the Dead does not frequently describe occasions when Ra defeated the chaos snake explicitly called Apophis. Only Book of the Dead Spells 7 and 39 can be explained as such.

== Gallery ==
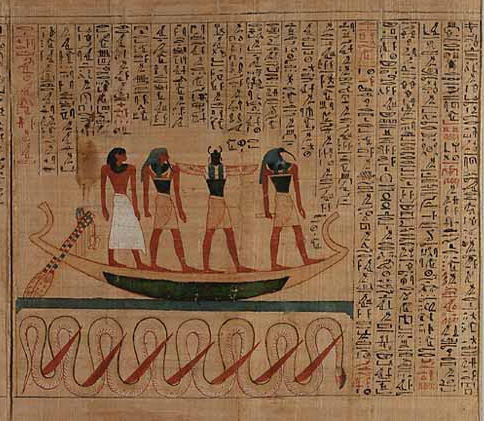
Apophis below the barque of Ra with seven knives, Book of the Dead of Amenemsaouf, 21st Dynasty, Louvre Museum, Paris

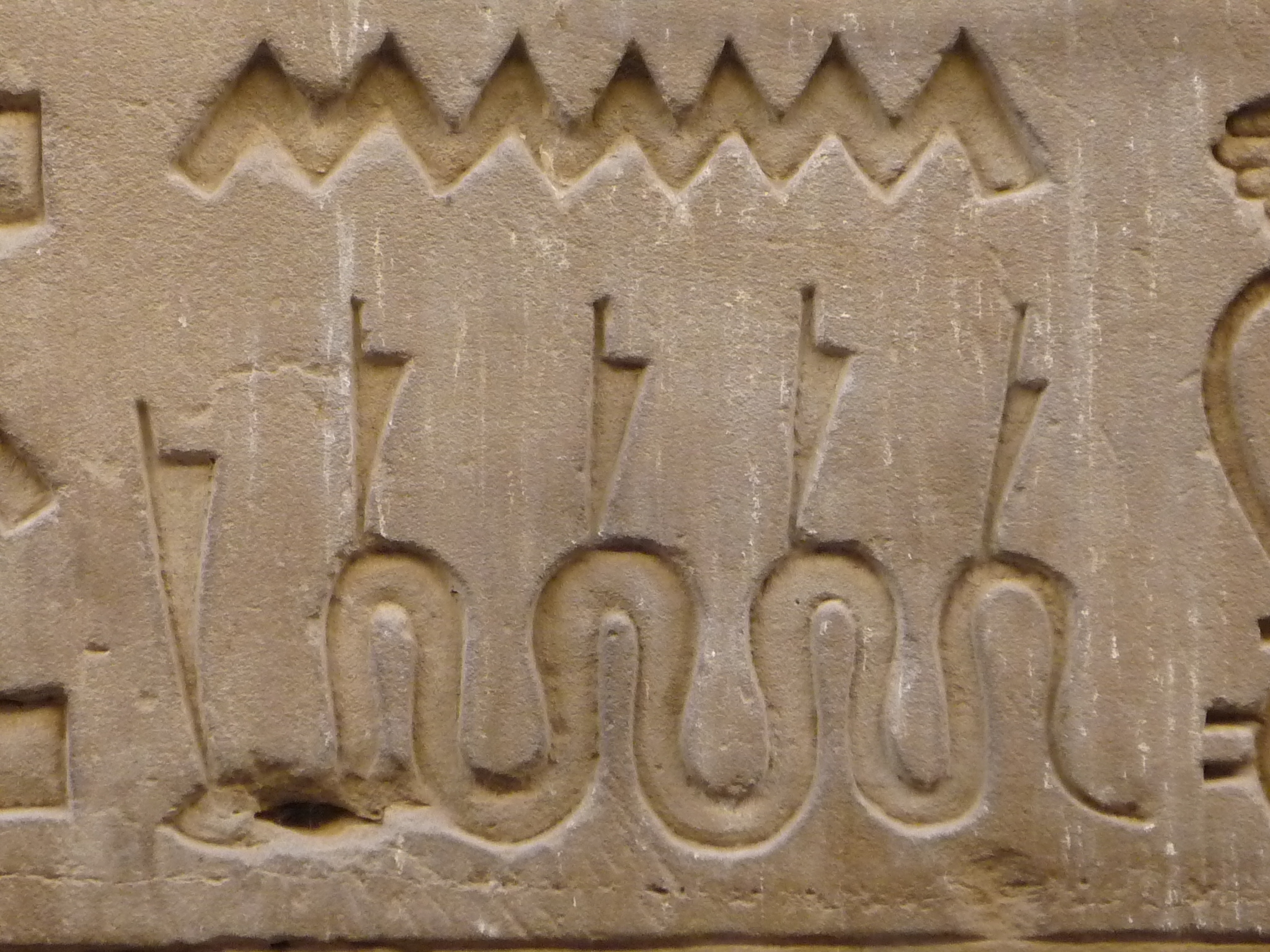
The hieroglyph for Apophis name showing a serpent stabbed with five knives, Temple of Edfu, Ptolemaic period

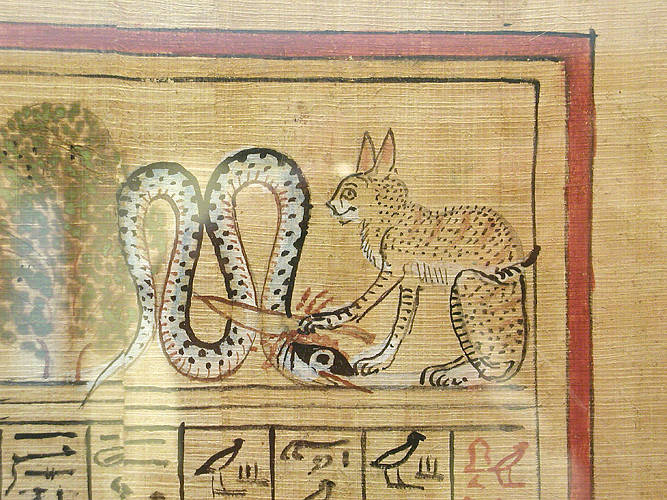
Ra, in the form of a cat, smiting Apophis with a knife. Papyrus of Hunefer, 19th dynasty

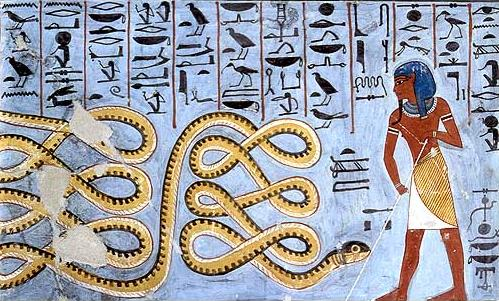
Atum facing Apophis, tomb of Ramesses I, 19th Dynasty (c. 1292–1290 BC)

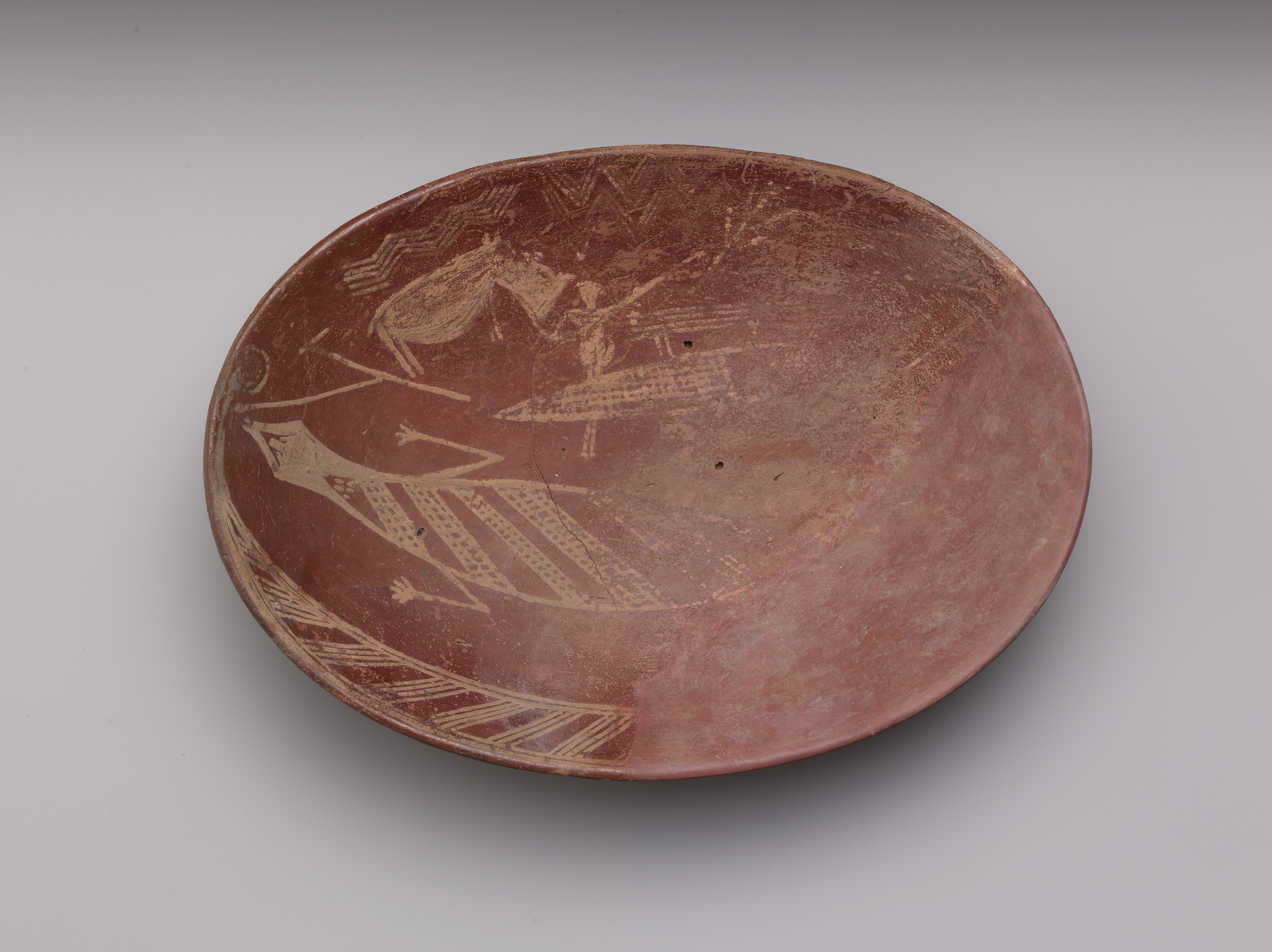
Example of a Naqada 1 C-Ware bowl (though not the one depicting Apophis )

== See also ==
- 99942 Apophis, near Earth asteroid
- Ancient serpent
- Apep (star system), triple star system that is a gamma-ray burst progenitor in the Milky Way
- Apollyon
- Ethnoherpetology
- Referenced in John Langan's The Fisherman (novel), the world-girdling serpent harnessed as a source of magical potency
- Nikko Jenkins, American criminal who motivated his series of murders by claiming that he is a worshipper of Apophis
- Jörmungandr
- Leviathan
- Mehen
- Ouroboros
- Python (mythology)
- Satan
- Unut
- Vritra
- Wadjet
