= Aperture masking interferometry =

a) shows a simple experiment using an aperture mask in a re-imaged aperture plane. b) and c) show diagrams of aperture masks which were placed in front of the secondary mirror of the Keck telescope by Peter Tuthill and collaborators. The solid black shapes represent the subapertures (holes in the mask). A projection of the layout of the Keck primary mirror segments is overlaid.

Aperture masking interferometry (or Sparse aperture masking) is a form of speckle interferometry, that allows diffraction limited imaging from ground-based telescopes (like the Keck Telescope and the Very Large Telescope), and is a high contrast imaging mode on the James Webb Space Telescope. This technique allows ground-based telescopes to reach the maximum possible resolution, allowing ground-based telescopes with large diameters to produce far greater resolution than the Hubble Space Telescope. A mask is placed over the telescope which only allows light through a small number of holes. This array of holes acts as a miniature astronomical interferometer. The principal limitation of the technique is that it is applicable only to relatively bright astronomical objects, since the mask discards most of the light received from the astronomical source. The method was developed by John E. Baldwin and collaborators in the Cavendish Astrophysics Group at the University of Cambridge in the late 1980s.

== Description ==
In the aperture masking technique, the bispectral analysis (speckle masking) method is typically applied to image data taken through masked apertures, where most of the aperture is blocked off and light can only pass through a series of small holes (subapertures). The aperture mask removes atmospheric noise from these measurements through the use of closure quantities, allowing the bispectrum to be measured more quickly than for an un-masked aperture.

For simplicity the aperture masks are usually either placed in front of the secondary mirror (e.g. Tuthill et al. 2000) or placed in a re-imaged aperture plane (e.g. Haniff et al. 1987; Young et al. 2000; Baldwin et al. 1986), as shown in Figure 1.a) . The masks are usually categorised either as non-redundant or partially redundant. Non-redundant masks consist of arrays of small holes where no two pairs of holes have the same separation vector (the same baseline – see aperture synthesis).

Each pair of holes provides a set of fringes at a unique spatial frequency in the image plane. Partially redundant masks are usually designed to provide a compromise between minimizing the redundancy of spacings and maximizing both the throughput and the range of spatial frequencies investigated (Haniff & Buscher 1992; Haniff et al. 1989). Figures 1.b) and 1.c) show examples of aperture masks used in front of the secondary at the Keck telescope by Peter Tuthill and collaborators; Figure 1.b) is a non-redundant mask while Figure 1.c) is partially redundant.

Although the signal-to-noise of speckle masking observations at high light level can be improved with aperture masks, the faintest limiting magnitude cannot be significantly improved for photon-noise limited detectors (see Buscher & Haniff 1993).

== Interferometry with the James Webb Space Telescope ==
Aperture Masking Interferometry is available on the James Webb Space Telescope, which is the first execution of this technique (or any form of interferometry) in space. This is enabled by a non-redundant mask with seven holes (sub-apertures), which is embedded as a mode of the NIRISS instrument.

== See also ==
- List of astronomical interferometers at visible and infrared wavelengths
