= Poznań Observatory =

Coordinates: 52.3944°N 16.8745°E

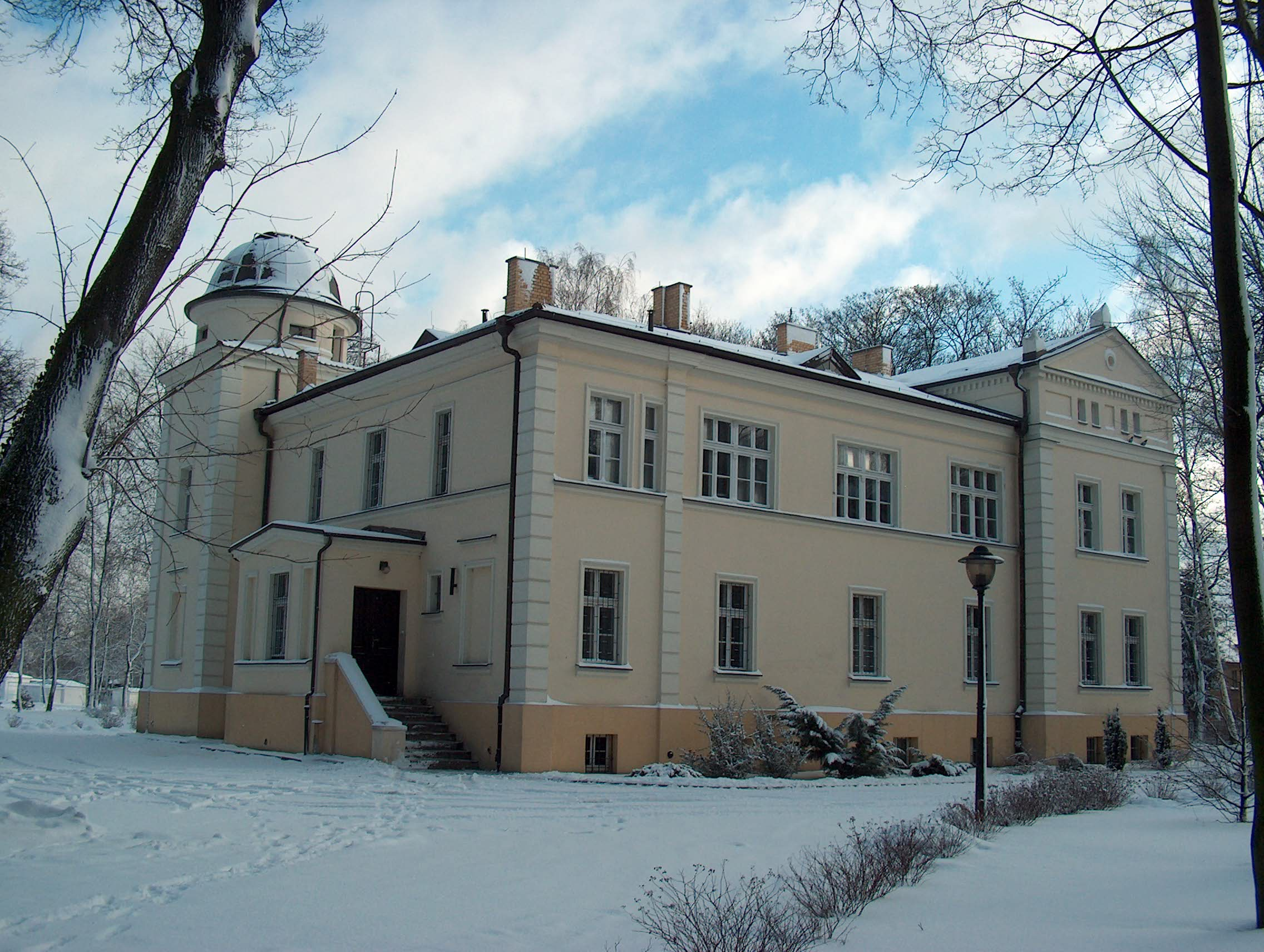
Poznań facility

Poznań Observatory (Polish: Obserwatorium Astronomiczne Uniwersytet im. Adama Mickiewicza w Poznaniu or "OA UAM", obs. code: 047) is an astronomical observatory owned and operated by the physics department of Adam Mickiewicz University in Poznań. It is located in Poznań, Poland and was founded in 1919.

In January 1953, asteroid 1572 Posnania (1949 SC), discovered at Poznań, was named after the city and the discovering observatory (M.P.C. 877). Asteroid 97786 Oauam, discovered by astronomers Petr Pravec and Peter Kušnirák at Ondřejov in 2000, was also named in honor of the observatory. The official naming citation was published by the IAU on 16 June 2021.
