= Meanings of minor-planet names: 97001–98000 =

As minor planet discoveries are confirmed, they are given a permanent number by the IAU's Minor Planet Center (MPC), and the discoverers can then submit names for them, following the IAU's naming conventions. The list below concerns those minor planets in the specified number-range that have received names, and explains the meanings of those names.

Official naming citations of newly named small Solar System bodies are approved and published in a bulletin by IAU's Working Group for Small Bodies Nomenclature (WGSBN). Before May 2021, citations were published in MPC's Minor Planet Circulars for many decades. Recent citations can also be found on the JPL Small-Body Database (SBDB). Until his death in 2016, German astronomer Lutz D. Schmadel compiled these citations into the Dictionary of Minor Planet Names (DMP) and regularly updated the collection.

Based on Paul Herget's The Names of the Minor Planets, Schmadel also researched the unclear origin of numerous asteroids, most of which had been named prior to World War II. This article incorporates text from this source, which is in the public domain: SBDB New namings may only be added to this list below after official publication as the preannouncement of names is condemned. The WGSBN publishes a comprehensive guideline for the naming rules of non-cometary small Solar System bodies.

== 97001–97100 ==
Named minor planet	Provisional	This minor planet was named for...	Ref · Catalog
97069 Stek	1999 VB_{23}	Stefano Klett (born 1964) is a Swiss computer scientist and amateur astronomer who observes minor planets from his home town of Camorino. He is the promoter of the Ticino section of Dark Sky Switzerland.	JPL · 97069

== 97101–97200 ==
back to top

Named minor planet	Provisional	This minor planet was named for...	Ref · Catalog
97186 Tore	1999 WP_{8}	Salvatore Silanus (born 1961), nicknamed Tore, is a friend of Swiss astronomer Stefano Sposetti who discovered this minor planet.	JPL · 97186

== 97201–97300 ==
back to top

Named minor planet	Provisional	This minor planet was named for...	Ref · Catalog
97268 Serafinozani	1999 XD_{127}	The Serafino Zani Astronomical Observatory (Osservatorio astronomico Serafino Zani) in Italy was built by Serafino Zani and his family on San Bernardo hill in the commune of Lumezzane in Brescia, Lombardy, and then given to the local amateur astronomers.	JPL · 97268

== 97301–97400 ==
back to top

Named minor planet	Provisional	This minor planet was named for...	Ref · Catalog
97336 Thomasafleming	1999 YB_{1}	Thomas Anthony Fleming (born 1960) is an American x-ray astronomer and educator at the University of Arizona's Steward Observatory. He discovered that DA-type white dwarfs were not copious x-ray sources, and he is known for creating and expanding interactive computer-based astronomy education.	JPL · 97336

== 97401–97500 ==
back to top

Named minor planet	Provisional	This minor planet was named for...	Ref · Catalog
97448 Bertorosco	2000 BW_{33}	Bertha (Bert) Orosco, long-time administrative associate at the University of Arizona's Lunar and Planetary Laboratory and the Department of Planetary Sciences.	IAU · 97448
97471 Amybrenton	2000 CS_{40}	Amy Brenton, long-time academic advisor at the University of Arizona's Lunar and Planetary Laboratory (LPL) and the Department of Planetary Sciences.	IAU · 97471
97472 Hobby	2000 CB_{41}	The Hobby Foundation supports museums and educational organizations throughout Texas. Ten thousand schoolchildren and members of the public a year view the wonders of the heavens through the Hobby telescope at the Houston Museum of Natural Science's George Observatory.	JPL · 97472

== 97501–97600 ==
back to top

Named minor planet	Provisional	This minor planet was named for...	Ref · Catalog
97508 Bolden	2000 CU_{110}	Charles Frank Bolden Jr. (born 1946) is a former American astronaut who flew on four space shuttle missions (two as the pilot and two as the commander). From 2009 to 2017, he was the NASA Administrator.	JPL · 97508
97509 Pierrehaenecour	2000 CC_{112}	Pierre Haenecour, Belgian cosmochemist and planetary scientist.	IAU · 97509
97512 Jemison	2000 CV_{118}	Mae Carol Jemison (born 1956) is a retired American astronaut who flew on the space shuttle in 1992. On the space shuttle she conducted scientific experiments. She was the first African American woman to travel into space and the first African American woman admitted into the astronaut training program.	JPL · 97512
97578 Jessicabarnes	2000 DP_{116}	Jessica Barnes, British cosmochemist.	IAU · 97578
97582 Hijikawa	2000 EP_{15}	Hijikawa River is a 103-km-long river in the Japanese Ehime prefecture. It has its source near the Tosaka Pass in Seiyo City and flows into the Seto Inland Sea. With more than 470 tributaries, the river has supplied its abundant water to the people in the southern part of Ehime, especially for irrigation.	JPL · 97582

== 97601–97700 ==
back to top

Named minor planet	Provisional	This minor planet was named for...	Ref · Catalog
97631 Kentrobinson	2000 ED_{144}	Ernest Kent Robinson (born 1939), a member of the advisory board at Lowell Observatory, enthusiastically spearheaded the capital campaign for a collection center and library to protect, preserve and make available the historic archives of that institution.	JPL · 97631
97632 Mathewwells	2000 EL_{145}	Mathew Wells, American administrative staff member at the Lunar and Planetary Lab where he supports the OSIRIS-REx and OSIRIS-APEX missions.	IAU · 97632
97637 Blennert	2000 EQ_{156}	John Blennert (born 1951) is a meteorite hunter in Tucson, Arizona, one of three co-discoverers of the Gold Basin Meteorite Strewn Field	JPL · 97637
97646 Karifigueroa	2000 EK_{198}	Kari Figueroa, a long-time senior accountant at the University of Arizona's Lunar and Planetary Laboratory and the Department of Planetary Sciences.	IAU · 97646
97677 Rachelfreed	2000 FE_{57}	Rachel Freed (born 1972) is a teacher, an education curriculum specialist, and an avid long-distance runner. She works with the Astronomical Society of the Pacific as a volunteer and researcher.	JPL · 97677

== 97701–97800 ==
back to top

Named minor planet	Provisional	This minor planet was named for...	Ref · Catalog
97786 Oauam	2000 NU_{2}	The Poznań Observatory of Adam Mickiewicz University (OA UAM) in Poznań, Poland. The observatory (047) was active in asteroid and comet observations starting in the 1930s. In the 1990s the focus shifted to physical studies of asteroids. Currently OA UAM is the main center for studies of small Solar System bodies in Poland.	IAU · 97786

== 97801–97900 ==
back to top

Named minor planet	Provisional	This minor planet was named for...	Ref · Catalog
There are no named minor planets in this number range

== 97901–98000 ==
back to top

Named minor planet	Provisional	This minor planet was named for...	Ref · Catalog
There are no named minor planets in this number range

back to top

Preceded by 96,001–97,000	Meanings of minor-planet names List of minor planets: 97,001–98,000	Succeeded by 98,001–99,000
