= List of minor planets: 97001–98000 =

The following is a partial list of minor planets, running from minor-planet number 97001 through 98000, inclusive. The primary data for this and other partial lists is based on JPL's "Small-Body Orbital Elements" and data available from the Minor Planet Center. Critical list information is also provided by the MPC, unless otherwise specified from Lowell Observatory. A detailed description of the table's columns and additional sources are given on the main page including a complete list of every page in this series, and a statistical break-up on the dynamical classification of minor planets.

Also see the summary list of all named bodies in numerical and alphabetical order, and the corresponding naming citations for the number range of this particular list. New namings may only be added to this list after official publication, as the preannouncement of names is condemned by the Working Group for Small Bodies Nomenclature of the International Astronomical Union.

Near-Earth obj.	MBA (inner)	MBA (outer)	Centaur
Mars-crosser	MBA (middle)	Jupiter trojan	Trans-Neptunian obj.
Unclassified

== 97001–97100 ==
Designation			Discovery			Properties		Ref
Permanent	Provisional	Named after	Date	Site	Discoverer(s)	Category	Diam.	Ref
97001	1999 TW_{238}	—	October 4, 1999	Catalina	CSS	MRX	2.4 km	MPC · JPL
97002	1999 TX_{240}	—	October 4, 1999	Catalina	CSS	·	4.0 km	MPC · JPL
97003	1999 TZ_{240}	—	October 4, 1999	Catalina	CSS	·	3.9 km	MPC · JPL
97004	1999 TS_{241}	—	October 4, 1999	Catalina	CSS	·	5.7 km	MPC · JPL
97005	1999 TT_{243}	—	October 6, 1999	Socorro	LINEAR	·	4.0 km	MPC · JPL
97006	1999 TS_{246}	—	October 6, 1999	Socorro	LINEAR	·	3.3 km	MPC · JPL
97007	1999 TU_{250}	—	October 9, 1999	Catalina	CSS	·	2.8 km	MPC · JPL
97008	1999 TX_{251}	—	October 8, 1999	Socorro	LINEAR	EUN	2.6 km	MPC · JPL
97009	1999 TN_{253}	—	October 10, 1999	Kitt Peak	Spacewatch	·	3.1 km	MPC · JPL
97010	1999 TK_{256}	—	October 9, 1999	Socorro	LINEAR	PAD	3.8 km	MPC · JPL
97011	1999 TS_{256}	—	October 9, 1999	Socorro	LINEAR	·	2.6 km	MPC · JPL
97012	1999 TC_{260}	—	October 13, 1999	Socorro	LINEAR	·	3.1 km	MPC · JPL
97013	1999 TJ_{260}	—	October 10, 1999	Socorro	LINEAR	THM	3.3 km	MPC · JPL
97014	1999 TV_{260}	—	October 12, 1999	Socorro	LINEAR	EUN	2.9 km	MPC · JPL
97015	1999 TR_{262}	—	October 14, 1999	Socorro	LINEAR	·	4.0 km	MPC · JPL
97016	1999 TS_{262}	—	October 14, 1999	Socorro	LINEAR	MAR	6.2 km	MPC · JPL
97017	1999 TJ_{263}	—	October 15, 1999	Kitt Peak	Spacewatch	·	2.2 km	MPC · JPL
97018	1999 TB_{271}	—	October 3, 1999	Socorro	LINEAR	·	2.9 km	MPC · JPL
97019	1999 TW_{274}	—	October 6, 1999	Socorro	LINEAR	(5)	2.1 km	MPC · JPL
97020	1999 TX_{278}	—	October 6, 1999	Socorro	LINEAR	·	7.0 km	MPC · JPL
97021	1999 TJ_{279}	—	October 7, 1999	Socorro	LINEAR	slow	3.1 km	MPC · JPL
97022	1999 TT_{279}	—	October 7, 1999	Socorro	LINEAR	THM	6.0 km	MPC · JPL
97023	1999 TZ_{280}	—	October 8, 1999	Socorro	LINEAR	EUN	2.3 km	MPC · JPL
97024	1999 TS_{283}	—	October 9, 1999	Socorro	LINEAR	·	4.7 km	MPC · JPL
97025	1999 TK_{284}	—	October 9, 1999	Socorro	LINEAR	EUN	2.8 km	MPC · JPL
97026	1999 TF_{287}	—	October 10, 1999	Socorro	LINEAR	·	5.3 km	MPC · JPL
97027	1999 TJ_{289}	—	October 10, 1999	Socorro	LINEAR	(5)	2.9 km	MPC · JPL
97028	1999 TA_{292}	—	October 11, 1999	Socorro	LINEAR	·	2.9 km	MPC · JPL
97029	1999 TT_{323}	—	October 14, 1999	Socorro	LINEAR	·	4.1 km	MPC · JPL
97030	1999 UA_{2}	—	October 18, 1999	Olathe	Olathe	·	2.9 km	MPC · JPL
97031	1999 UW_{2}	—	October 19, 1999	Fountain Hills	C. W. Juels	EUN	3.7 km	MPC · JPL
97032	1999 UL_{3}	—	October 20, 1999	Oohira	T. Urata	·	5.3 km	MPC · JPL
97033	1999 UW_{3}	—	October 31, 1999	Prescott	P. G. Comba	·	2.4 km	MPC · JPL
97034	1999 UK_{7}	—	October 30, 1999	Socorro	LINEAR	moon	2.8 km	MPC · JPL
97035	1999 UB_{8}	—	October 29, 1999	Catalina	CSS	·	5.1 km	MPC · JPL
97036	1999 UR_{8}	—	October 29, 1999	Catalina	CSS	·	6.9 km	MPC · JPL
97037	1999 US_{8}	—	October 29, 1999	Catalina	CSS	·	2.8 km	MPC · JPL
97038	1999 UX_{14}	—	October 29, 1999	Catalina	CSS	EUN	3.1 km	MPC · JPL
97039	1999 UB_{15}	—	October 29, 1999	Catalina	CSS	·	2.7 km	MPC · JPL
97040	1999 UJ_{15}	—	October 29, 1999	Catalina	CSS	·	3.7 km	MPC · JPL
97041	1999 UT_{15}	—	October 29, 1999	Catalina	CSS	·	3.5 km	MPC · JPL
97042	1999 UM_{19}	—	October 30, 1999	Kitt Peak	Spacewatch	·	3.7 km	MPC · JPL
97043	1999 UE_{24}	—	October 28, 1999	Catalina	CSS	·	3.7 km	MPC · JPL
97044	1999 UL_{26}	—	October 30, 1999	Catalina	CSS	·	3.5 km	MPC · JPL
97045	1999 UY_{29}	—	October 31, 1999	Kitt Peak	Spacewatch	·	1.9 km	MPC · JPL
97046	1999 UF_{30}	—	October 31, 1999	Kitt Peak	Spacewatch	·	2.7 km	MPC · JPL
97047	1999 UN_{35}	—	October 31, 1999	Catalina	CSS	·	3.9 km	MPC · JPL
97048	1999 US_{42}	—	October 28, 1999	Catalina	CSS	·	2.8 km	MPC · JPL
97049	1999 UK_{44}	—	October 29, 1999	Catalina	CSS	·	4.1 km	MPC · JPL
97050	1999 UD_{45}	—	October 31, 1999	Catalina	CSS	·	5.7 km	MPC · JPL
97051	1999 UO_{49}	—	October 30, 1999	Catalina	CSS	·	3.4 km	MPC · JPL
97052	1999 UV_{49}	—	October 30, 1999	Catalina	CSS	·	2.9 km	MPC · JPL
97053	1999 UY_{49}	—	October 30, 1999	Catalina	CSS	·	2.5 km	MPC · JPL
97054	1999 UO_{50}	—	October 30, 1999	Catalina	CSS	·	2.1 km	MPC · JPL
97055	1999 UE_{52}	—	October 31, 1999	Catalina	CSS	ADE	4.2 km	MPC · JPL
97056	1999 UL_{52}	—	October 31, 1999	Catalina	CSS	·	2.9 km	MPC · JPL
97057	1999 UY_{52}	—	October 31, 1999	Catalina	CSS	·	3.8 km	MPC · JPL
97058	1999 UA_{59}	—	October 30, 1999	Anderson Mesa	LONEOS	·	6.9 km	MPC · JPL
97059	1999 VU_{3}	—	November 1, 1999	Kitt Peak	Spacewatch	KOR	3.1 km	MPC · JPL
97060	1999 VF_{4}	—	November 1, 1999	Catalina	CSS	·	4.3 km	MPC · JPL
97061	1999 VE_{5}	—	November 5, 1999	Višnjan Observatory	K. Korlević	EUN	3.2 km	MPC · JPL
97062	1999 VZ_{5}	—	November 5, 1999	Oizumi	T. Kobayashi	EOS	6.8 km	MPC · JPL
97063	1999 VK_{14}	—	November 2, 1999	Socorro	LINEAR	H	1.3 km	MPC · JPL
97064	1999 VF_{16}	—	November 2, 1999	Kitt Peak	Spacewatch	·	3.9 km	MPC · JPL
97065	1999 VV_{20}	—	November 9, 1999	Nachi-Katsuura	Y. Shimizu, T. Urata	BRA	3.2 km	MPC · JPL
97066	1999 VC_{21}	—	November 13, 1999	Farra d'Isonzo	Farra d'Isonzo	·	3.4 km	MPC · JPL
97067	1999 VL_{21}	—	November 12, 1999	Višnjan Observatory	K. Korlević	·	4.5 km	MPC · JPL
97068	1999 VT_{21}	—	November 12, 1999	Višnjan Observatory	K. Korlević	·	2.6 km	MPC · JPL
97069 Stek	1999 VB_{23}	Stek	November 12, 1999	Gnosca	S. Sposetti	·	2.6 km	MPC · JPL
97070	1999 VK_{26}	—	November 3, 1999	Socorro	LINEAR	·	8.2 km	MPC · JPL
97071	1999 VO_{27}	—	November 3, 1999	Catalina	CSS	·	5.4 km	MPC · JPL
97072	1999 VU_{27}	—	November 3, 1999	Catalina	CSS	·	1.6 km	MPC · JPL
97073	1999 VW_{28}	—	November 3, 1999	Socorro	LINEAR	·	4.6 km	MPC · JPL
97074	1999 VR_{30}	—	November 3, 1999	Socorro	LINEAR	·	5.2 km	MPC · JPL
97075	1999 VF_{32}	—	November 3, 1999	Socorro	LINEAR	·	4.8 km	MPC · JPL
97076	1999 VT_{32}	—	November 3, 1999	Socorro	LINEAR	AGN	2.7 km	MPC · JPL
97077	1999 VG_{33}	—	November 3, 1999	Socorro	LINEAR	·	6.3 km	MPC · JPL
97078	1999 VS_{33}	—	November 3, 1999	Socorro	LINEAR	·	3.1 km	MPC · JPL
97079	1999 VO_{36}	—	November 3, 1999	Socorro	LINEAR	EUN	5.2 km	MPC · JPL
97080	1999 VZ_{36}	—	November 3, 1999	Socorro	LINEAR	·	3.8 km	MPC · JPL
97081	1999 VW_{38}	—	November 10, 1999	Socorro	LINEAR	·	3.3 km	MPC · JPL
97082	1999 VW_{39}	—	November 11, 1999	Kitt Peak	Spacewatch	ADE	5.9 km	MPC · JPL
97083	1999 VS_{44}	—	November 4, 1999	Catalina	CSS	(5)	2.4 km	MPC · JPL
97084	1999 VJ_{45}	—	November 4, 1999	Catalina	CSS	·	3.9 km	MPC · JPL
97085	1999 VM_{47}	—	November 3, 1999	Socorro	LINEAR	HNS	2.8 km	MPC · JPL
97086	1999 VH_{49}	—	November 3, 1999	Socorro	LINEAR	·	3.5 km	MPC · JPL
97087	1999 VQ_{50}	—	November 3, 1999	Socorro	LINEAR	NAE	6.7 km	MPC · JPL
97088	1999 VC_{54}	—	November 4, 1999	Socorro	LINEAR	(5)	2.9 km	MPC · JPL
97089	1999 VY_{56}	—	November 4, 1999	Socorro	LINEAR	KOR	2.8 km	MPC · JPL
97090	1999 VM_{57}	—	November 4, 1999	Socorro	LINEAR	·	3.5 km	MPC · JPL
97091	1999 VF_{59}	—	November 4, 1999	Socorro	LINEAR	·	3.4 km	MPC · JPL
97092	1999 VP_{59}	—	November 4, 1999	Socorro	LINEAR	·	2.8 km	MPC · JPL
97093	1999 VQ_{59}	—	November 4, 1999	Socorro	LINEAR	·	3.5 km	MPC · JPL
97094	1999 VZ_{59}	—	November 4, 1999	Socorro	LINEAR	·	4.4 km	MPC · JPL
97095	1999 VA_{61}	—	November 4, 1999	Socorro	LINEAR	NAE	5.9 km	MPC · JPL
97096	1999 VC_{61}	—	November 4, 1999	Socorro	LINEAR	KOR	3.5 km	MPC · JPL
97097	1999 VD_{65}	—	November 4, 1999	Socorro	LINEAR	·	3.2 km	MPC · JPL
97098	1999 VF_{66}	—	November 4, 1999	Socorro	LINEAR	·	3.9 km	MPC · JPL
97099	1999 VN_{67}	—	November 4, 1999	Socorro	LINEAR	·	3.4 km	MPC · JPL
97100	1999 VP_{67}	—	November 4, 1999	Socorro	LINEAR	·	2.8 km	MPC · JPL

== 97101–97200 ==
back to top

Designation			Discovery			Properties		Ref
Permanent	Provisional	Named after	Date	Site	Discoverer(s)	Category	Diam.	Ref
97101	1999 VU_{67}	—	November 4, 1999	Socorro	LINEAR	ADE	8.8 km	MPC · JPL
97102	1999 VY_{69}	—	November 4, 1999	Socorro	LINEAR	·	3.9 km	MPC · JPL
97103	1999 VB_{70}	—	November 4, 1999	Socorro	LINEAR	·	3.1 km	MPC · JPL
97104	1999 VM_{71}	—	November 4, 1999	Socorro	LINEAR	KOR	2.6 km	MPC · JPL
97105	1999 VP_{71}	—	November 4, 1999	Socorro	LINEAR	·	4.3 km	MPC · JPL
97106	1999 VU_{71}	—	November 4, 1999	Socorro	LINEAR	KOR	2.9 km	MPC · JPL
97107	1999 VC_{74}	—	November 4, 1999	Kitt Peak	Spacewatch	HOF	4.6 km	MPC · JPL
97108	1999 VM_{78}	—	November 4, 1999	Socorro	LINEAR	NEM	2.9 km	MPC · JPL
97109	1999 VD_{79}	—	November 4, 1999	Socorro	LINEAR	·	3.3 km	MPC · JPL
97110	1999 VB_{82}	—	November 5, 1999	Socorro	LINEAR	·	2.0 km	MPC · JPL
97111	1999 VJ_{83}	—	November 1, 1999	Kitt Peak	Spacewatch	·	3.3 km	MPC · JPL
97112	1999 VW_{83}	—	November 3, 1999	Kitt Peak	Spacewatch	·	3.6 km	MPC · JPL
97113	1999 VM_{86}	—	November 5, 1999	Socorro	LINEAR	·	2.9 km	MPC · JPL
97114	1999 VK_{87}	—	November 4, 1999	Socorro	LINEAR	·	3.2 km	MPC · JPL
97115	1999 VG_{90}	—	November 5, 1999	Socorro	LINEAR	(5)	2.3 km	MPC · JPL
97116	1999 VJ_{90}	—	November 5, 1999	Socorro	LINEAR	·	5.7 km	MPC · JPL
97117	1999 VJ_{94}	—	November 9, 1999	Socorro	LINEAR	fast	2.9 km	MPC · JPL
97118	1999 VS_{94}	—	November 9, 1999	Socorro	LINEAR	AGN	2.5 km	MPC · JPL
97119	1999 VT_{94}	—	November 9, 1999	Socorro	LINEAR	·	3.5 km	MPC · JPL
97120	1999 VX_{94}	—	November 9, 1999	Socorro	LINEAR	·	2.8 km	MPC · JPL
97121	1999 VK_{97}	—	November 9, 1999	Socorro	LINEAR	·	1.9 km	MPC · JPL
97122	1999 VM_{98}	—	November 9, 1999	Socorro	LINEAR	KOR ·	2.9 km	MPC · JPL
97123	1999 VT_{98}	—	November 9, 1999	Socorro	LINEAR	·	1.9 km	MPC · JPL
97124	1999 VD_{101}	—	November 9, 1999	Socorro	LINEAR	·	3.9 km	MPC · JPL
97125	1999 VG_{102}	—	November 9, 1999	Socorro	LINEAR	EUN	2.3 km	MPC · JPL
97126	1999 VR_{105}	—	November 9, 1999	Socorro	LINEAR	EOS	3.5 km	MPC · JPL
97127	1999 VW_{107}	—	November 9, 1999	Socorro	LINEAR	·	5.9 km	MPC · JPL
97128	1999 VH_{108}	—	November 9, 1999	Socorro	LINEAR	·	5.0 km	MPC · JPL
97129	1999 VB_{110}	—	November 9, 1999	Socorro	LINEAR	·	2.1 km	MPC · JPL
97130	1999 VN_{110}	—	November 9, 1999	Socorro	LINEAR	·	5.1 km	MPC · JPL
97131	1999 VV_{111}	—	November 9, 1999	Socorro	LINEAR	·	4.9 km	MPC · JPL
97132	1999 VQ_{114}	—	November 9, 1999	Catalina	CSS	·	4.9 km	MPC · JPL
97133	1999 VF_{115}	—	November 9, 1999	Catalina	CSS	·	3.7 km	MPC · JPL
97134	1999 VG_{115}	—	November 9, 1999	Catalina	CSS	·	3.2 km	MPC · JPL
97135	1999 VJ_{115}	—	November 9, 1999	Catalina	CSS	·	2.5 km	MPC · JPL
97136	1999 VW_{115}	—	November 4, 1999	Kitt Peak	Spacewatch	KOR	1.9 km	MPC · JPL
97137	1999 VW_{121}	—	November 4, 1999	Kitt Peak	Spacewatch	KOR	2.3 km	MPC · JPL
97138	1999 VX_{123}	—	November 5, 1999	Kitt Peak	Spacewatch	·	5.9 km	MPC · JPL
97139	1999 VA_{130}	—	November 11, 1999	Kitt Peak	Spacewatch	·	3.0 km	MPC · JPL
97140	1999 VX_{132}	—	November 10, 1999	Kitt Peak	Spacewatch	·	1.6 km	MPC · JPL
97141	1999 VT_{133}	—	November 10, 1999	Kitt Peak	Spacewatch	·	3.6 km	MPC · JPL
97142	1999 VJ_{141}	—	November 10, 1999	Kitt Peak	Spacewatch	·	3.7 km	MPC · JPL
97143	1999 VW_{142}	—	November 13, 1999	Kitt Peak	Spacewatch	·	2.1 km	MPC · JPL
97144	1999 VM_{143}	—	November 14, 1999	Socorro	LINEAR	·	4.2 km	MPC · JPL
97145	1999 VX_{144}	—	November 13, 1999	Catalina	CSS	MAR	5.8 km	MPC · JPL
97146	1999 VR_{147}	—	November 14, 1999	Socorro	LINEAR	·	3.0 km	MPC · JPL
97147	1999 VY_{148}	—	November 14, 1999	Socorro	LINEAR	·	3.6 km	MPC · JPL
97148	1999 VY_{151}	—	November 9, 1999	Kitt Peak	Spacewatch	·	2.2 km	MPC · JPL
97149	1999 VM_{155}	—	November 15, 1999	Kitt Peak	Spacewatch	GEF	2.6 km	MPC · JPL
97150	1999 VW_{156}	—	November 12, 1999	Socorro	LINEAR	·	10 km	MPC · JPL
97151	1999 VA_{159}	—	November 14, 1999	Socorro	LINEAR	·	2.4 km	MPC · JPL
97152	1999 VU_{160}	—	November 14, 1999	Socorro	LINEAR	·	4.7 km	MPC · JPL
97153	1999 VR_{161}	—	November 14, 1999	Socorro	LINEAR	·	3.5 km	MPC · JPL
97154	1999 VA_{162}	—	November 14, 1999	Socorro	LINEAR	·	3.7 km	MPC · JPL
97155	1999 VE_{163}	—	November 14, 1999	Socorro	LINEAR	·	4.5 km	MPC · JPL
97156	1999 VT_{163}	—	November 14, 1999	Socorro	LINEAR	KOR	3.2 km	MPC · JPL
97157	1999 VP_{165}	—	November 14, 1999	Socorro	LINEAR	fast	3.7 km	MPC · JPL
97158	1999 VV_{166}	—	November 14, 1999	Socorro	LINEAR	·	2.5 km	MPC · JPL
97159	1999 VP_{172}	—	November 14, 1999	Socorro	LINEAR	EOS	4.8 km	MPC · JPL
97160	1999 VE_{182}	—	November 9, 1999	Socorro	LINEAR	·	4.2 km	MPC · JPL
97161	1999 VV_{182}	—	November 9, 1999	Socorro	LINEAR	THM	4.0 km	MPC · JPL
97162	1999 VW_{184}	—	November 15, 1999	Socorro	LINEAR	·	4.2 km	MPC · JPL
97163	1999 VO_{186}	—	November 15, 1999	Socorro	LINEAR	·	6.7 km	MPC · JPL
97164	1999 VX_{186}	—	November 15, 1999	Socorro	LINEAR	·	6.5 km	MPC · JPL
97165	1999 VG_{187}	—	November 15, 1999	Socorro	LINEAR	·	2.9 km	MPC · JPL
97166	1999 VO_{187}	—	November 15, 1999	Socorro	LINEAR	NYS	3.3 km	MPC · JPL
97167	1999 VG_{188}	—	November 15, 1999	Socorro	LINEAR	·	5.6 km	MPC · JPL
97168	1999 VO_{188}	—	November 15, 1999	Socorro	LINEAR	EOS	5.9 km	MPC · JPL
97169	1999 VZ_{192}	—	November 1, 1999	Anderson Mesa	LONEOS	·	5.3 km	MPC · JPL
97170	1999 VP_{194}	—	November 1, 1999	Catalina	CSS	·	4.0 km	MPC · JPL
97171	1999 VE_{195}	—	November 3, 1999	Catalina	CSS	·	2.7 km	MPC · JPL
97172	1999 VM_{195}	—	November 3, 1999	Catalina	CSS	·	2.3 km	MPC · JPL
97173	1999 VJ_{197}	—	November 3, 1999	Anderson Mesa	LONEOS	slow	6.9 km	MPC · JPL
97174	1999 VL_{199}	—	November 2, 1999	Catalina	CSS	ADE	8.2 km	MPC · JPL
97175	1999 VT_{203}	—	November 9, 1999	Anderson Mesa	LONEOS	·	3.8 km	MPC · JPL
97176	1999 VV_{210}	—	November 13, 1999	Catalina	CSS	EOS	4.2 km	MPC · JPL
97177	1999 VG_{215}	—	November 3, 1999	Socorro	LINEAR	·	2.6 km	MPC · JPL
97178	1999 VO_{216}	—	November 3, 1999	Socorro	LINEAR	·	4.3 km	MPC · JPL
97179	1999 VF_{223}	—	November 5, 1999	Socorro	LINEAR	·	5.3 km	MPC · JPL
97180	1999 VH_{224}	—	November 5, 1999	Socorro	LINEAR	·	3.3 km	MPC · JPL
97181	1999 VV_{228}	—	November 3, 1999	Socorro	LINEAR	·	5.1 km	MPC · JPL
97182	1999 WC	—	November 16, 1999	Sabino Canyon	McGaha, J.	EUN	4.4 km	MPC · JPL
97183	1999 WR_{1}	—	November 25, 1999	Višnjan Observatory	K. Korlević	HNS	2.9 km	MPC · JPL
97184	1999 WG_{3}	—	November 19, 1999	Kvistaberg	Uppsala-DLR Asteroid Survey	KOR	2.9 km	MPC · JPL
97185	1999 WR_{4}	—	November 28, 1999	Oizumi	T. Kobayashi	·	4.8 km	MPC · JPL
97186 Tore	1999 WP_{8}	Tore	November 28, 1999	Gnosca	S. Sposetti	·	5.3 km	MPC · JPL
97187	1999 WL_{10}	—	November 28, 1999	Kitt Peak	Spacewatch	·	3.3 km	MPC · JPL
97188	1999 WG_{12}	—	November 28, 1999	Kitt Peak	Spacewatch	·	4.6 km	MPC · JPL
97189	1999 WV_{12}	—	November 30, 1999	Kitt Peak	Spacewatch	·	3.5 km	MPC · JPL
97190	1999 WY_{14}	—	November 29, 1999	Kitt Peak	Spacewatch	·	1.8 km	MPC · JPL
97191	1999 WD_{16}	—	November 29, 1999	Kitt Peak	Spacewatch	·	2.8 km	MPC · JPL
97192	1999 WT_{16}	—	November 30, 1999	Kitt Peak	Spacewatch	GEF	3.2 km	MPC · JPL
97193	1999 WV_{16}	—	November 30, 1999	Kitt Peak	Spacewatch	·	2.0 km	MPC · JPL
97194	1999 WR_{20}	—	November 30, 1999	Kitt Peak	Spacewatch	(5)	2.7 km	MPC · JPL
97195	1999 WC_{26}	—	November 30, 1999	Kitt Peak	Spacewatch	·	3.8 km	MPC · JPL
97196	1999 XR_{1}	—	December 3, 1999	Prescott	P. G. Comba	·	3.5 km	MPC · JPL
97197	1999 XB_{3}	—	December 4, 1999	Catalina	CSS	·	4.0 km	MPC · JPL
97198	1999 XJ_{3}	—	December 4, 1999	Catalina	CSS	·	3.9 km	MPC · JPL
97199	1999 XD_{7}	—	December 4, 1999	Catalina	CSS	·	3.5 km	MPC · JPL
97200	1999 XK_{8}	—	December 3, 1999	Oizumi	T. Kobayashi	·	4.4 km	MPC · JPL

== 97201–97300 ==
back to top

Designation			Discovery			Properties		Ref
Permanent	Provisional	Named after	Date	Site	Discoverer(s)	Category	Diam.	Ref
97201	1999 XQ_{8}	—	December 5, 1999	Socorro	LINEAR	·	4.9 km	MPC · JPL
97202	1999 XJ_{11}	—	December 5, 1999	Catalina	CSS	·	4.0 km	MPC · JPL
97203	1999 XC_{15}	—	December 6, 1999	Socorro	LINEAR	H	1.8 km	MPC · JPL
97204	1999 XC_{20}	—	December 5, 1999	Socorro	LINEAR	·	2.8 km	MPC · JPL
97205	1999 XA_{22}	—	December 5, 1999	Socorro	LINEAR	slow	5.8 km	MPC · JPL
97206	1999 XE_{27}	—	December 6, 1999	Socorro	LINEAR	·	3.1 km	MPC · JPL
97207	1999 XV_{30}	—	December 6, 1999	Socorro	LINEAR	(12739)	3.6 km	MPC · JPL
97208	1999 XK_{33}	—	December 6, 1999	Socorro	LINEAR	H	1.2 km	MPC · JPL
97209	1999 XM_{36}	—	December 7, 1999	Fountain Hills	C. W. Juels	MAR	4.5 km	MPC · JPL
97210	1999 XX_{36}	—	December 7, 1999	Fountain Hills	C. W. Juels	·	4.3 km	MPC · JPL
97211	1999 XY_{36}	—	December 7, 1999	Fountain Hills	C. W. Juels	MAR	4.2 km	MPC · JPL
97212	1999 XT_{38}	—	December 7, 1999	Campo Catino	Catino, Campo	·	3.7 km	MPC · JPL
97213	1999 XN_{40}	—	December 7, 1999	Socorro	LINEAR	KOR	2.8 km	MPC · JPL
97214	1999 XW_{41}	—	December 7, 1999	Socorro	LINEAR	·	2.3 km	MPC · JPL
97215	1999 XS_{45}	—	December 7, 1999	Socorro	LINEAR	·	3.1 km	MPC · JPL
97216	1999 XW_{47}	—	December 7, 1999	Socorro	LINEAR	·	3.3 km	MPC · JPL
97217	1999 XO_{48}	—	December 7, 1999	Socorro	LINEAR	KOR	2.7 km	MPC · JPL
97218	1999 XS_{48}	—	December 7, 1999	Socorro	LINEAR	(21344)	3.3 km	MPC · JPL
97219	1999 XS_{49}	—	December 7, 1999	Socorro	LINEAR	·	3.2 km	MPC · JPL
97220	1999 XW_{49}	—	December 7, 1999	Socorro	LINEAR	·	3.3 km	MPC · JPL
97221	1999 XH_{50}	—	December 7, 1999	Socorro	LINEAR	(5)	3.8 km	MPC · JPL
97222	1999 XK_{50}	—	December 7, 1999	Socorro	LINEAR	·	6.4 km	MPC · JPL
97223	1999 XK_{51}	—	December 7, 1999	Socorro	LINEAR	·	4.4 km	MPC · JPL
97224	1999 XG_{52}	—	December 7, 1999	Socorro	LINEAR	·	3.2 km	MPC · JPL
97225	1999 XY_{53}	—	December 7, 1999	Socorro	LINEAR	·	4.5 km	MPC · JPL
97226	1999 XC_{54}	—	December 7, 1999	Socorro	LINEAR	·	7.4 km	MPC · JPL
97227	1999 XG_{54}	—	December 7, 1999	Socorro	LINEAR	EOS	5.9 km	MPC · JPL
97228	1999 XW_{56}	—	December 7, 1999	Socorro	LINEAR	·	6.5 km	MPC · JPL
97229	1999 XS_{57}	—	December 7, 1999	Socorro	LINEAR	·	6.9 km	MPC · JPL
97230	1999 XE_{59}	—	December 7, 1999	Socorro	LINEAR	·	3.9 km	MPC · JPL
97231	1999 XG_{60}	—	December 7, 1999	Socorro	LINEAR	·	3.5 km	MPC · JPL
97232	1999 XO_{60}	—	December 7, 1999	Socorro	LINEAR	EUN	2.5 km	MPC · JPL
97233	1999 XJ_{61}	—	December 7, 1999	Socorro	LINEAR	·	4.3 km	MPC · JPL
97234	1999 XF_{62}	—	December 7, 1999	Socorro	LINEAR	·	2.3 km	MPC · JPL
97235	1999 XO_{69}	—	December 7, 1999	Socorro	LINEAR	·	3.4 km	MPC · JPL
97236	1999 XW_{75}	—	December 7, 1999	Socorro	LINEAR	EUP	8.6 km	MPC · JPL
97237	1999 XT_{77}	—	December 7, 1999	Socorro	LINEAR	HYG	7.0 km	MPC · JPL
97238	1999 XY_{79}	—	December 7, 1999	Socorro	LINEAR	·	2.4 km	MPC · JPL
97239	1999 XP_{81}	—	December 7, 1999	Socorro	LINEAR	·	2.3 km	MPC · JPL
97240	1999 XP_{84}	—	December 7, 1999	Socorro	LINEAR	·	8.4 km	MPC · JPL
97241	1999 XR_{84}	—	December 7, 1999	Socorro	LINEAR	·	3.4 km	MPC · JPL
97242	1999 XE_{88}	—	December 7, 1999	Socorro	LINEAR	·	3.0 km	MPC · JPL
97243	1999 XG_{90}	—	December 7, 1999	Socorro	LINEAR	EOS	3.9 km	MPC · JPL
97244	1999 XL_{90}	—	December 7, 1999	Socorro	LINEAR	·	5.1 km	MPC · JPL
97245	1999 XW_{92}	—	December 7, 1999	Socorro	LINEAR	·	2.7 km	MPC · JPL
97246	1999 XX_{93}	—	December 7, 1999	Socorro	LINEAR	·	4.5 km	MPC · JPL
97247	1999 XC_{101}	—	December 7, 1999	Socorro	LINEAR	·	5.1 km	MPC · JPL
97248	1999 XO_{106}	—	December 4, 1999	Catalina	CSS	EUN	3.3 km	MPC · JPL
97249	1999 XT_{106}	—	December 4, 1999	Catalina	CSS	·	3.6 km	MPC · JPL
97250	1999 XW_{107}	—	December 4, 1999	Catalina	CSS	·	4.2 km	MPC · JPL
97251	1999 XX_{107}	—	December 4, 1999	Catalina	CSS	·	5.0 km	MPC · JPL
97252	1999 XY_{107}	—	December 4, 1999	Catalina	CSS	·	2.8 km	MPC · JPL
97253	1999 XT_{108}	—	December 4, 1999	Catalina	CSS	·	3.2 km	MPC · JPL
97254	1999 XK_{112}	—	December 10, 1999	Socorro	LINEAR	·	4.1 km	MPC · JPL
97255	1999 XS_{114}	—	December 11, 1999	Socorro	LINEAR	EUN	4.7 km	MPC · JPL
97256	1999 XC_{115}	—	December 11, 1999	Socorro	LINEAR	·	3.5 km	MPC · JPL
97257	1999 XE_{115}	—	December 12, 1999	Socorro	LINEAR	H	2.1 km	MPC · JPL
97258	1999 XD_{116}	—	December 5, 1999	Catalina	CSS	·	4.1 km	MPC · JPL
97259	1999 XF_{119}	—	December 5, 1999	Catalina	CSS	·	2.8 km	MPC · JPL
97260	1999 XG_{119}	—	December 5, 1999	Catalina	CSS	DOR	6.5 km	MPC · JPL
97261	1999 XT_{119}	—	December 5, 1999	Catalina	CSS	MRX	2.6 km	MPC · JPL
97262	1999 XT_{121}	—	December 6, 1999	Catalina	CSS	EUN	3.2 km	MPC · JPL
97263	1999 XC_{122}	—	December 7, 1999	Catalina	CSS	·	3.4 km	MPC · JPL
97264	1999 XB_{125}	—	December 7, 1999	Catalina	CSS	·	4.4 km	MPC · JPL
97265	1999 XM_{125}	—	December 7, 1999	Catalina	CSS	EOS	4.7 km	MPC · JPL
97266	1999 XS_{126}	—	December 7, 1999	Catalina	CSS	·	2.5 km	MPC · JPL
97267	1999 XC_{127}	—	December 7, 1999	Catalina	CSS	·	4.6 km	MPC · JPL
97268 Serafinozani	1999 XD_{127}	Serafinozani	December 7, 1999	Catalina	CSS	(5)	3.1 km	MPC · JPL
97269	1999 XB_{130}	—	December 12, 1999	Socorro	LINEAR	EUN	2.8 km	MPC · JPL
97270	1999 XK_{137}	—	December 15, 1999	Prescott	P. G. Comba	·	6.3 km	MPC · JPL
97271	1999 XJ_{139}	—	December 2, 1999	Kitt Peak	Spacewatch	·	3.7 km	MPC · JPL
97272	1999 XH_{140}	—	December 2, 1999	Kitt Peak	Spacewatch	KOR	2.3 km	MPC · JPL
97273	1999 XZ_{140}	—	December 2, 1999	Kitt Peak	Spacewatch	·	4.7 km	MPC · JPL
97274	1999 XG_{142}	—	December 12, 1999	Socorro	LINEAR	·	9.6 km	MPC · JPL
97275	1999 XT_{142}	—	December 13, 1999	Socorro	LINEAR	·	14 km	MPC · JPL
97276	1999 XC_{143}	—	December 14, 1999	Fountain Hills	C. W. Juels	·	5.8 km	MPC · JPL
97277	1999 XJ_{144}	—	December 15, 1999	Fountain Hills	C. W. Juels	·	5.8 km	MPC · JPL
97278	1999 XM_{144}	—	December 15, 1999	Fountain Hills	C. W. Juels	·	9.9 km	MPC · JPL
97279	1999 XT_{144}	—	December 6, 1999	Višnjan Observatory	K. Korlević	·	8.0 km	MPC · JPL
97280	1999 XZ_{150}	—	December 9, 1999	Anderson Mesa	LONEOS	·	6.7 km	MPC · JPL
97281	1999 XD_{151}	—	December 9, 1999	Anderson Mesa	LONEOS	·	2.9 km	MPC · JPL
97282	1999 XQ_{152}	—	December 7, 1999	Socorro	LINEAR	·	4.3 km	MPC · JPL
97283	1999 XH_{155}	—	December 8, 1999	Socorro	LINEAR	·	7.9 km	MPC · JPL
97284	1999 XC_{159}	—	December 8, 1999	Socorro	LINEAR	·	5.0 km	MPC · JPL
97285	1999 XE_{161}	—	December 12, 1999	Socorro	LINEAR	·	3.8 km	MPC · JPL
97286	1999 XF_{162}	—	December 13, 1999	Socorro	LINEAR	·	3.4 km	MPC · JPL
97287	1999 XP_{163}	—	December 8, 1999	Kitt Peak	Spacewatch	·	5.3 km	MPC · JPL
97288	1999 XM_{164}	—	December 8, 1999	Socorro	LINEAR	TIR	6.0 km	MPC · JPL
97289	1999 XR_{165}	—	December 8, 1999	Socorro	LINEAR	H	1.3 km	MPC · JPL
97290	1999 XK_{167}	—	December 10, 1999	Socorro	LINEAR	·	4.2 km	MPC · JPL
97291	1999 XL_{169}	—	December 10, 1999	Socorro	LINEAR	·	6.7 km	MPC · JPL
97292	1999 XQ_{172}	—	December 10, 1999	Socorro	LINEAR	EOS	4.8 km	MPC · JPL
97293	1999 XG_{175}	—	December 10, 1999	Socorro	LINEAR	LUT	10 km	MPC · JPL
97294	1999 XW_{177}	—	December 10, 1999	Socorro	LINEAR	·	6.3 km	MPC · JPL
97295	1999 XP_{178}	—	December 10, 1999	Socorro	LINEAR	GEF	3.0 km	MPC · JPL
97296	1999 XS_{179}	—	December 10, 1999	Socorro	LINEAR	·	6.6 km	MPC · JPL
97297	1999 XU_{180}	—	December 10, 1999	Socorro	LINEAR	·	9.7 km	MPC · JPL
97298	1999 XA_{181}	—	December 12, 1999	Socorro	LINEAR	GEF	2.6 km	MPC · JPL
97299	1999 XB_{181}	—	December 12, 1999	Socorro	LINEAR	DOR	7.0 km	MPC · JPL
97300	1999 XM_{183}	—	December 12, 1999	Socorro	LINEAR	·	3.2 km	MPC · JPL

== 97301–97400 ==
back to top

Designation			Discovery			Properties		Ref
Permanent	Provisional	Named after	Date	Site	Discoverer(s)	Category	Diam.	Ref
97301	1999 XN_{186}	—	December 12, 1999	Socorro	LINEAR	MRX	2.1 km	MPC · JPL
97302	1999 XS_{189}	—	December 12, 1999	Socorro	LINEAR	PAD	3.5 km	MPC · JPL
97303	1999 XL_{190}	—	December 12, 1999	Socorro	LINEAR	·	4.6 km	MPC · JPL
97304	1999 XQ_{190}	—	December 12, 1999	Socorro	LINEAR	EOS	4.1 km	MPC · JPL
97305	1999 XU_{191}	—	December 12, 1999	Socorro	LINEAR	·	4.9 km	MPC · JPL
97306	1999 XH_{192}	—	December 12, 1999	Socorro	LINEAR	·	3.7 km	MPC · JPL
97307	1999 XL_{192}	—	December 12, 1999	Socorro	LINEAR	URS	9.3 km	MPC · JPL
97308	1999 XT_{192}	—	December 12, 1999	Socorro	LINEAR	·	5.7 km	MPC · JPL
97309	1999 XG_{196}	—	December 12, 1999	Socorro	LINEAR	·	5.4 km	MPC · JPL
97310	1999 XU_{197}	—	December 12, 1999	Socorro	LINEAR	·	6.5 km	MPC · JPL
97311	1999 XB_{198}	—	December 12, 1999	Socorro	LINEAR	·	5.7 km	MPC · JPL
97312	1999 XQ_{201}	—	December 12, 1999	Socorro	LINEAR	·	5.4 km	MPC · JPL
97313	1999 XM_{206}	—	December 12, 1999	Socorro	LINEAR	·	10 km	MPC · JPL
97314	1999 XV_{206}	—	December 12, 1999	Socorro	LINEAR	slow	2.9 km	MPC · JPL
97315	1999 XA_{211}	—	December 13, 1999	Socorro	LINEAR	·	3.9 km	MPC · JPL
97316	1999 XC_{212}	—	December 13, 1999	Socorro	LINEAR	·	7.9 km	MPC · JPL
97317	1999 XS_{213}	—	December 14, 1999	Socorro	LINEAR	·	6.6 km	MPC · JPL
97318	1999 XW_{214}	—	December 14, 1999	Socorro	LINEAR	·	4.0 km	MPC · JPL
97319	1999 XH_{215}	—	December 14, 1999	Socorro	LINEAR	·	10 km	MPC · JPL
97320	1999 XM_{219}	—	December 15, 1999	Kitt Peak	Spacewatch	KOR	2.6 km	MPC · JPL
97321	1999 XO_{220}	—	December 14, 1999	Socorro	LINEAR	EUN	3.7 km	MPC · JPL
97322	1999 XQ_{231}	—	December 8, 1999	Catalina	CSS	·	4.8 km	MPC · JPL
97323	1999 XU_{232}	—	December 14, 1999	Kitt Peak	Spacewatch	THM	3.4 km	MPC · JPL
97324	1999 XE_{235}	—	December 4, 1999	Catalina	CSS	EOS	4.2 km	MPC · JPL
97325	1999 XM_{241}	—	December 13, 1999	Anderson Mesa	LONEOS	·	4.0 km	MPC · JPL
97326	1999 XN_{241}	—	December 13, 1999	Anderson Mesa	LONEOS	·	3.3 km	MPC · JPL
97327	1999 XZ_{241}	—	December 13, 1999	Catalina	CSS	·	3.8 km	MPC · JPL
97328	1999 XJ_{242}	—	December 12, 1999	Socorro	LINEAR	·	5.7 km	MPC · JPL
97329	1999 XO_{243}	—	December 3, 1999	Anderson Mesa	LONEOS	·	10 km	MPC · JPL
97330	1999 XE_{245}	—	December 5, 1999	Socorro	LINEAR	·	8.2 km	MPC · JPL
97331	1999 XV_{245}	—	December 5, 1999	Socorro	LINEAR	EOS	3.9 km	MPC · JPL
97332	1999 XN_{249}	—	December 6, 1999	Socorro	LINEAR	EOS	4.3 km	MPC · JPL
97333	1999 XW_{256}	—	December 7, 1999	Catalina	CSS	EUP ·	12 km	MPC · JPL
97334	1999 XY_{256}	—	December 7, 1999	Catalina	CSS	EOS	5.0 km	MPC · JPL
97335	1999 YF	—	December 16, 1999	Socorro	LINEAR	H	1.0 km	MPC · JPL
97336 Thomasafleming	1999 YB_{1}	Thomasafleming	December 16, 1999	Grasslands	McGaha, J.	·	1.7 km	MPC · JPL
97337	1999 YA_{3}	—	December 17, 1999	Socorro	LINEAR	·	6.8 km	MPC · JPL
97338	1999 YM_{12}	—	December 27, 1999	Kitt Peak	Spacewatch	·	6.3 km	MPC · JPL
97339	1999 YN_{14}	—	December 30, 1999	Socorro	LINEAR	·	5.8 km	MPC · JPL
97340	1999 YS_{27}	—	December 30, 1999	Socorro	LINEAR	·	5.5 km	MPC · JPL
97341	2000 AU_{1}	—	January 2, 2000	Višnjan Observatory	K. Korlević	·	4.3 km	MPC · JPL
97342	2000 AH_{4}	—	January 3, 2000	Socorro	LINEAR	H	1.4 km	MPC · JPL
97343	2000 AW_{6}	—	January 2, 2000	Socorro	LINEAR	·	2.5 km	MPC · JPL
97344	2000 AZ_{7}	—	January 2, 2000	Socorro	LINEAR	·	9.0 km	MPC · JPL
97345	2000 AO_{8}	—	January 2, 2000	Socorro	LINEAR	HYG	6.7 km	MPC · JPL
97346	2000 AF_{10}	—	January 3, 2000	Socorro	LINEAR	ADE	10 km	MPC · JPL
97347	2000 AX_{11}	—	January 3, 2000	Socorro	LINEAR	·	6.3 km	MPC · JPL
97348	2000 AB_{12}	—	January 3, 2000	Socorro	LINEAR	(5)	2.5 km	MPC · JPL
97349	2000 AM_{14}	—	January 3, 2000	Socorro	LINEAR	THM	5.3 km	MPC · JPL
97350	2000 AT_{14}	—	January 3, 2000	Socorro	LINEAR	·	4.0 km	MPC · JPL
97351	2000 AX_{18}	—	January 3, 2000	Socorro	LINEAR	·	5.5 km	MPC · JPL
97352	2000 AL_{21}	—	January 3, 2000	Socorro	LINEAR	·	8.8 km	MPC · JPL
97353	2000 AE_{23}	—	January 3, 2000	Socorro	LINEAR	NAE	7.4 km	MPC · JPL
97354	2000 AZ_{24}	—	January 3, 2000	Socorro	LINEAR	·	3.9 km	MPC · JPL
97355	2000 AX_{25}	—	January 3, 2000	Socorro	LINEAR	EOS	4.7 km	MPC · JPL
97356	2000 AY_{27}	—	January 5, 2000	Sormano	A. Testa, P. Chiavenna	KOR	2.9 km	MPC · JPL
97357	2000 AA_{29}	—	January 3, 2000	Socorro	LINEAR	EOS	5.4 km	MPC · JPL
97358	2000 AA_{30}	—	January 3, 2000	Socorro	LINEAR	EOS	4.5 km	MPC · JPL
97359	2000 AC_{32}	—	January 3, 2000	Socorro	LINEAR	·	8.0 km	MPC · JPL
97360	2000 AG_{32}	—	January 3, 2000	Socorro	LINEAR	HYG	7.3 km	MPC · JPL
97361	2000 AV_{32}	—	January 3, 2000	Socorro	LINEAR	·	3.9 km	MPC · JPL
97362	2000 AR_{34}	—	January 3, 2000	Socorro	LINEAR	·	7.7 km	MPC · JPL
97363	2000 AS_{36}	—	January 3, 2000	Socorro	LINEAR	·	6.8 km	MPC · JPL
97364	2000 AZ_{42}	—	January 5, 2000	Socorro	LINEAR	·	7.1 km	MPC · JPL
97365	2000 AB_{43}	—	January 5, 2000	Socorro	LINEAR	(40134)	3.8 km	MPC · JPL
97366	2000 AZ_{47}	—	January 4, 2000	Socorro	LINEAR	CLO	4.9 km	MPC · JPL
97367	2000 AS_{51}	—	January 4, 2000	Socorro	LINEAR	·	3.2 km	MPC · JPL
97368	2000 AG_{52}	—	January 4, 2000	Socorro	LINEAR	·	4.7 km	MPC · JPL
97369	2000 AF_{55}	—	January 4, 2000	Socorro	LINEAR	THM	5.8 km	MPC · JPL
97370	2000 AF_{58}	—	January 4, 2000	Socorro	LINEAR	·	8.0 km	MPC · JPL
97371	2000 AO_{58}	—	January 4, 2000	Socorro	LINEAR	·	3.9 km	MPC · JPL
97372	2000 AB_{62}	—	January 4, 2000	Socorro	LINEAR	·	5.1 km	MPC · JPL
97373	2000 AE_{63}	—	January 4, 2000	Socorro	LINEAR	·	2.6 km	MPC · JPL
97374	2000 AS_{65}	—	January 4, 2000	Socorro	LINEAR	·	4.7 km	MPC · JPL
97375	2000 AX_{66}	—	January 4, 2000	Socorro	LINEAR	·	4.7 km	MPC · JPL
97376	2000 AF_{67}	—	January 4, 2000	Socorro	LINEAR	THM	5.2 km	MPC · JPL
97377	2000 AL_{67}	—	January 4, 2000	Socorro	LINEAR	EOS	4.1 km	MPC · JPL
97378	2000 AN_{67}	—	January 4, 2000	Socorro	LINEAR	EOS	5.2 km	MPC · JPL
97379	2000 AJ_{69}	—	January 5, 2000	Socorro	LINEAR	·	6.8 km	MPC · JPL
97380	2000 AR_{69}	—	January 5, 2000	Socorro	LINEAR	TIR	8.4 km	MPC · JPL
97381	2000 AO_{72}	—	January 5, 2000	Socorro	LINEAR	·	2.8 km	MPC · JPL
97382	2000 AS_{72}	—	January 5, 2000	Socorro	LINEAR	·	3.9 km	MPC · JPL
97383	2000 AJ_{76}	—	January 5, 2000	Socorro	LINEAR	·	5.6 km	MPC · JPL
97384	2000 AF_{82}	—	January 5, 2000	Socorro	LINEAR	fast	5.7 km	MPC · JPL
97385	2000 AE_{85}	—	January 5, 2000	Socorro	LINEAR	·	6.4 km	MPC · JPL
97386	2000 AQ_{86}	—	January 5, 2000	Socorro	LINEAR	·	2.7 km	MPC · JPL
97387	2000 AY_{88}	—	January 5, 2000	Socorro	LINEAR	EOS	4.8 km	MPC · JPL
97388	2000 AU_{90}	—	January 5, 2000	Socorro	LINEAR	GEF	2.8 km	MPC · JPL
97389	2000 AZ_{96}	—	January 4, 2000	Socorro	LINEAR	·	4.9 km	MPC · JPL
97390	2000 AD_{99}	—	January 5, 2000	Socorro	LINEAR	·	3.0 km	MPC · JPL
97391	2000 AZ_{100}	—	January 5, 2000	Socorro	LINEAR	·	3.4 km	MPC · JPL
97392	2000 AE_{101}	—	January 5, 2000	Socorro	LINEAR	·	3.7 km	MPC · JPL
97393	2000 AK_{101}	—	January 5, 2000	Socorro	LINEAR	·	2.5 km	MPC · JPL
97394	2000 AR_{102}	—	January 5, 2000	Socorro	LINEAR	·	3.5 km	MPC · JPL
97395	2000 AT_{102}	—	January 5, 2000	Socorro	LINEAR	·	3.8 km	MPC · JPL
97396	2000 AK_{103}	—	January 5, 2000	Socorro	LINEAR	·	5.0 km	MPC · JPL
97397	2000 AG_{106}	—	January 5, 2000	Socorro	LINEAR	·	7.0 km	MPC · JPL
97398	2000 AR_{108}	—	January 5, 2000	Socorro	LINEAR	·	4.0 km	MPC · JPL
97399	2000 AR_{115}	—	January 5, 2000	Socorro	LINEAR	·	11 km	MPC · JPL
97400	2000 AG_{124}	—	January 5, 2000	Socorro	LINEAR	DOR	6.4 km	MPC · JPL

== 97401–97500 ==
back to top

Designation			Discovery			Properties		Ref
Permanent	Provisional	Named after	Date	Site	Discoverer(s)	Category	Diam.	Ref
97401	2000 AK_{124}	—	January 5, 2000	Socorro	LINEAR	·	11 km	MPC · JPL
97402	2000 AQ_{128}	—	January 5, 2000	Socorro	LINEAR	·	5.9 km	MPC · JPL
97403	2000 AQ_{131}	—	January 2, 2000	Socorro	LINEAR	·	3.0 km	MPC · JPL
97404	2000 AY_{131}	—	January 3, 2000	Socorro	LINEAR	·	7.6 km	MPC · JPL
97405	2000 AW_{135}	—	January 4, 2000	Socorro	LINEAR	·	3.0 km	MPC · JPL
97406	2000 AY_{135}	—	January 4, 2000	Socorro	LINEAR	(11097)	6.9 km	MPC · JPL
97407	2000 AU_{138}	—	January 5, 2000	Socorro	LINEAR	(5)	3.5 km	MPC · JPL
97408	2000 AV_{138}	—	January 5, 2000	Socorro	LINEAR	·	3.6 km	MPC · JPL
97409	2000 AT_{139}	—	January 5, 2000	Socorro	LINEAR	EUN	3.2 km	MPC · JPL
97410	2000 AW_{148}	—	January 7, 2000	Socorro	LINEAR	·	3.6 km	MPC · JPL
97411	2000 AT_{151}	—	January 8, 2000	Socorro	LINEAR	EUN	4.4 km	MPC · JPL
97412	2000 AO_{153}	—	January 2, 2000	Socorro	LINEAR	HNS	3.1 km	MPC · JPL
97413	2000 AZ_{153}	—	January 2, 2000	Socorro	LINEAR	EOS	4.9 km	MPC · JPL
97414	2000 AF_{154}	—	January 2, 2000	Socorro	LINEAR	·	4.8 km	MPC · JPL
97415	2000 AZ_{155}	—	January 3, 2000	Socorro	LINEAR	H	1.1 km	MPC · JPL
97416	2000 AE_{161}	—	January 3, 2000	Socorro	LINEAR	·	8.8 km	MPC · JPL
97417	2000 AT_{161}	—	January 4, 2000	Socorro	LINEAR	CLO	6.0 km	MPC · JPL
97418	2000 AK_{162}	—	January 4, 2000	Socorro	LINEAR	·	5.5 km	MPC · JPL
97419	2000 AU_{168}	—	January 7, 2000	Socorro	LINEAR	·	3.0 km	MPC · JPL
97420	2000 AN_{169}	—	January 7, 2000	Socorro	LINEAR	·	3.7 km	MPC · JPL
97421	2000 AK_{176}	—	January 7, 2000	Socorro	LINEAR	DOR	4.8 km	MPC · JPL
97422	2000 AO_{185}	—	January 8, 2000	Socorro	LINEAR	·	4.6 km	MPC · JPL
97423	2000 AE_{187}	—	January 8, 2000	Socorro	LINEAR	·	4.5 km	MPC · JPL
97424	2000 AB_{191}	—	January 8, 2000	Socorro	LINEAR	·	4.7 km	MPC · JPL
97425	2000 AP_{192}	—	January 8, 2000	Socorro	LINEAR	·	5.7 km	MPC · JPL
97426	2000 AH_{194}	—	January 8, 2000	Socorro	LINEAR	·	7.2 km	MPC · JPL
97427	2000 AK_{199}	—	January 9, 2000	Socorro	LINEAR	·	3.1 km	MPC · JPL
97428	2000 AT_{199}	—	January 9, 2000	Socorro	LINEAR	·	5.0 km	MPC · JPL
97429	2000 AT_{201}	—	January 9, 2000	Socorro	LINEAR	H	970 m	MPC · JPL
97430	2000 AZ_{202}	—	January 10, 2000	Socorro	LINEAR	·	6.3 km	MPC · JPL
97431	2000 AR_{204}	—	January 8, 2000	Socorro	LINEAR	·	6.7 km	MPC · JPL
97432	2000 AG_{227}	—	January 10, 2000	Kitt Peak	Spacewatch	·	8.0 km	MPC · JPL
97433	2000 AP_{230}	—	January 3, 2000	Socorro	LINEAR	·	3.4 km	MPC · JPL
97434	2000 AU_{234}	—	January 5, 2000	Socorro	LINEAR	HYG	6.7 km	MPC · JPL
97435	2000 AX_{235}	—	January 5, 2000	Anderson Mesa	LONEOS	EOS	4.4 km	MPC · JPL
97436	2000 AB_{238}	—	January 6, 2000	Anderson Mesa	LONEOS	EUN	3.8 km	MPC · JPL
97437	2000 AR_{238}	—	January 6, 2000	Socorro	LINEAR	(5651)	6.5 km	MPC · JPL
97438	2000 AH_{244}	—	January 8, 2000	Socorro	LINEAR	·	3.2 km	MPC · JPL
97439	2000 AF_{248}	—	January 2, 2000	Socorro	LINEAR	MAR	4.3 km	MPC · JPL
97440	2000 AW_{249}	—	January 4, 2000	Kitt Peak	Spacewatch	·	3.6 km	MPC · JPL
97441	2000 BH_{2}	—	January 28, 2000	Kitt Peak	Spacewatch	·	6.2 km	MPC · JPL
97442	2000 BF_{7}	—	January 29, 2000	Socorro	LINEAR	·	3.8 km	MPC · JPL
97443	2000 BD_{18}	—	January 30, 2000	Socorro	LINEAR	HYG	6.0 km	MPC · JPL
97444	2000 BW_{20}	—	January 28, 2000	Kitt Peak	Spacewatch	·	2.1 km	MPC · JPL
97445	2000 BK_{21}	—	January 29, 2000	Kitt Peak	Spacewatch	EOS	3.4 km	MPC · JPL
97446	2000 BB_{27}	—	January 30, 2000	Socorro	LINEAR	·	3.2 km	MPC · JPL
97447	2000 BM_{30}	—	January 27, 2000	Kitt Peak	Spacewatch	·	9.0 km	MPC · JPL
97448 Bertorosco	2000 BW_{33}	Bertorosco	January 30, 2000	Catalina	CSS	EOS	4.0 km	MPC · JPL
97449	2000 BE_{39}	—	January 27, 2000	Kitt Peak	Spacewatch	KOR	2.7 km	MPC · JPL
97450	2000 BE_{49}	—	January 27, 2000	Kitt Peak	Spacewatch	·	3.6 km	MPC · JPL
97451	2000 CA	—	February 1, 2000	Oizumi	T. Kobayashi	(8737)	7.8 km	MPC · JPL
97452	2000 CB_{8}	—	February 2, 2000	Socorro	LINEAR	H	1.0 km	MPC · JPL
97453	2000 CG_{9}	—	February 2, 2000	Socorro	LINEAR	·	7.2 km	MPC · JPL
97454	2000 CP_{9}	—	February 2, 2000	Socorro	LINEAR	·	3.5 km	MPC · JPL
97455	2000 CL_{13}	—	February 2, 2000	Socorro	LINEAR	·	7.3 km	MPC · JPL
97456	2000 CU_{13}	—	February 2, 2000	Socorro	LINEAR	·	6.6 km	MPC · JPL
97457	2000 CV_{15}	—	February 2, 2000	Socorro	LINEAR	·	6.2 km	MPC · JPL
97458	2000 CC_{18}	—	February 2, 2000	Socorro	LINEAR	·	3.0 km	MPC · JPL
97459	2000 CP_{19}	—	February 2, 2000	Socorro	LINEAR	·	5.0 km	MPC · JPL
97460	2000 CQ_{19}	—	February 2, 2000	Socorro	LINEAR	·	4.4 km	MPC · JPL
97461	2000 CZ_{19}	—	February 2, 2000	Socorro	LINEAR	EOS	5.1 km	MPC · JPL
97462	2000 CN_{22}	—	February 2, 2000	Socorro	LINEAR	·	5.3 km	MPC · JPL
97463	2000 CU_{25}	—	February 2, 2000	Socorro	LINEAR	·	3.6 km	MPC · JPL
97464	2000 CH_{26}	—	February 2, 2000	Socorro	LINEAR	HYG	5.6 km	MPC · JPL
97465	2000 CX_{30}	—	February 2, 2000	Socorro	LINEAR	·	3.7 km	MPC · JPL
97466	2000 CV_{31}	—	February 2, 2000	Socorro	LINEAR	EOS	4.5 km	MPC · JPL
97467	2000 CH_{33}	—	February 5, 2000	Olathe	Robinson, L.	·	6.0 km	MPC · JPL
97468	2000 CF_{37}	—	February 2, 2000	Socorro	LINEAR	·	5.3 km	MPC · JPL
97469	2000 CT_{38}	—	February 3, 2000	Socorro	LINEAR	·	6.2 km	MPC · JPL
97470	2000 CY_{39}	—	February 2, 2000	Socorro	LINEAR	H	1.3 km	MPC · JPL
97471 Amybrenton	2000 CS_{40}	Amybrenton	February 1, 2000	Catalina	CSS	·	5.3 km	MPC · JPL
97472 Hobby	2000 CB_{41}	Hobby	February 6, 2000	Needville	Needville	LIX	5.3 km	MPC · JPL
97473	2000 CF_{46}	—	February 2, 2000	Socorro	LINEAR	·	4.2 km	MPC · JPL
97474	2000 CX_{47}	—	February 2, 2000	Socorro	LINEAR	·	5.2 km	MPC · JPL
97475	2000 CP_{50}	—	February 2, 2000	Socorro	LINEAR	·	4.0 km	MPC · JPL
97476	2000 CS_{51}	—	February 2, 2000	Socorro	LINEAR	·	6.4 km	MPC · JPL
97477	2000 CG_{52}	—	February 2, 2000	Socorro	LINEAR	·	5.8 km	MPC · JPL
97478	2000 CP_{53}	—	February 2, 2000	Socorro	LINEAR	EOS	6.2 km	MPC · JPL
97479	2000 CU_{56}	—	February 4, 2000	Socorro	LINEAR	·	7.7 km	MPC · JPL
97480	2000 CV_{58}	—	February 6, 2000	Socorro	LINEAR	H	1.2 km	MPC · JPL
97481	2000 CF_{61}	—	February 2, 2000	Socorro	LINEAR	EOS	6.1 km	MPC · JPL
97482	2000 CC_{64}	—	February 2, 2000	Socorro	LINEAR	·	4.1 km	MPC · JPL
97483	2000 CU_{64}	—	February 3, 2000	Socorro	LINEAR	EOS	4.4 km	MPC · JPL
97484	2000 CC_{65}	—	February 3, 2000	Socorro	LINEAR	·	4.3 km	MPC · JPL
97485	2000 CO_{66}	—	February 6, 2000	Socorro	LINEAR	·	2.7 km	MPC · JPL
97486	2000 CS_{70}	—	February 7, 2000	Socorro	LINEAR	·	3.9 km	MPC · JPL
97487	2000 CS_{71}	—	February 7, 2000	Socorro	LINEAR	·	6.9 km	MPC · JPL
97488	2000 CG_{76}	—	February 5, 2000	Višnjan Observatory	K. Korlević	·	7.9 km	MPC · JPL
97489	2000 CQ_{76}	—	February 10, 2000	Višnjan Observatory	K. Korlević	(3460)	6.9 km	MPC · JPL
97490	2000 CU_{78}	—	February 8, 2000	Kitt Peak	Spacewatch	·	4.2 km	MPC · JPL
97491	2000 CX_{79}	—	February 8, 2000	Kitt Peak	Spacewatch	MAS	1.3 km	MPC · JPL
97492	2000 CG_{81}	—	February 4, 2000	Socorro	LINEAR	·	1.7 km	MPC · JPL
97493	2000 CU_{81}	—	February 4, 2000	Socorro	LINEAR	THM	4.4 km	MPC · JPL
97494	2000 CW_{81}	—	February 4, 2000	Socorro	LINEAR	·	8.1 km	MPC · JPL
97495	2000 CL_{85}	—	February 4, 2000	Socorro	LINEAR	·	6.0 km	MPC · JPL
97496	2000 CU_{86}	—	February 4, 2000	Socorro	LINEAR	·	9.2 km	MPC · JPL
97497	2000 CQ_{88}	—	February 4, 2000	Socorro	LINEAR	·	1.6 km	MPC · JPL
97498	2000 CX_{89}	—	February 5, 2000	Socorro	LINEAR	·	6.9 km	MPC · JPL
97499	2000 CH_{90}	—	February 6, 2000	Socorro	LINEAR	·	3.9 km	MPC · JPL
97500	2000 CY_{91}	—	February 6, 2000	Socorro	LINEAR	·	4.4 km	MPC · JPL

== 97501–97600 ==
back to top

Designation			Discovery			Properties		Ref
Permanent	Provisional	Named after	Date	Site	Discoverer(s)	Category	Diam.	Ref
97501	2000 CE_{92}	—	February 6, 2000	Socorro	LINEAR	·	7.7 km	MPC · JPL
97502	2000 CL_{93}	—	February 6, 2000	Socorro	LINEAR	·	3.0 km	MPC · JPL
97503	2000 CH_{94}	—	February 8, 2000	Socorro	LINEAR	EOS	5.5 km	MPC · JPL
97504	2000 CO_{97}	—	February 13, 2000	Oaxaca	Roe, J. M.	T_{j} (2.99)	7.1 km	MPC · JPL
97505	2000 CY_{99}	—	February 10, 2000	Kitt Peak	Spacewatch	·	2.9 km	MPC · JPL
97506	2000 CJ_{100}	—	February 10, 2000	Kitt Peak	Spacewatch	·	3.6 km	MPC · JPL
97507	2000 CV_{103}	—	February 8, 2000	Socorro	LINEAR	·	7.1 km	MPC · JPL
97508 Bolden	2000 CU_{110}	Bolden	February 6, 2000	Kitt Peak	M. W. Buie	·	5.7 km	MPC · JPL
97509 Pierrehaenecour	2000 CC_{112}	Pierrehaenecour	February 7, 2000	Catalina	CSS	·	4.5 km	MPC · JPL
97510	2000 CN_{112}	—	February 7, 2000	Kitt Peak	Spacewatch	·	3.7 km	MPC · JPL
97511	2000 CH_{118}	—	February 3, 2000	Socorro	LINEAR	·	4.5 km	MPC · JPL
97512 Jemison	2000 CV_{118}	Jemison	February 5, 2000	Kitt Peak	M. W. Buie	KOR	2.6 km	MPC · JPL
97513	2000 CD_{137}	—	February 4, 2000	Kitt Peak	Spacewatch	KOR	2.8 km	MPC · JPL
97514	2000 DL_{1}	—	February 25, 2000	Socorro	LINEAR	slow	9.0 km	MPC · JPL
97515	2000 DW_{3}	—	February 26, 2000	Socorro	LINEAR	H	1.3 km	MPC · JPL
97516	2000 DX_{3}	—	February 27, 2000	Socorro	LINEAR	(1101)	11 km	MPC · JPL
97517	2000 DV_{5}	—	February 26, 2000	Socorro	LINEAR	H	1.7 km	MPC · JPL
97518	2000 DR_{6}	—	February 28, 2000	Socorro	LINEAR	·	4.9 km	MPC · JPL
97519	2000 DM_{16}	—	February 29, 2000	Višnjan Observatory	K. Korlević	·	6.1 km	MPC · JPL
97520	2000 DA_{18}	—	February 25, 2000	Siding Spring	R. H. McNaught	·	5.3 km	MPC · JPL
97521	2000 DF_{18}	—	February 28, 2000	Socorro	LINEAR	EUN	2.9 km	MPC · JPL
97522	2000 DV_{19}	—	February 29, 2000	Socorro	LINEAR	·	4.6 km	MPC · JPL
97523	2000 DW_{22}	—	February 29, 2000	Socorro	LINEAR	·	3.9 km	MPC · JPL
97524	2000 DX_{22}	—	February 29, 2000	Socorro	LINEAR	EOS	3.7 km	MPC · JPL
97525	2000 DP_{24}	—	February 29, 2000	Socorro	LINEAR	·	4.1 km	MPC · JPL
97526	2000 DA_{25}	—	February 29, 2000	Socorro	LINEAR	·	6.8 km	MPC · JPL
97527	2000 DL_{25}	—	February 29, 2000	Socorro	LINEAR	·	6.8 km	MPC · JPL
97528	2000 DW_{25}	—	February 29, 2000	Socorro	LINEAR	EOS	4.9 km	MPC · JPL
97529	2000 DL_{26}	—	February 29, 2000	Socorro	LINEAR	EOS	4.7 km	MPC · JPL
97530	2000 DB_{28}	—	February 29, 2000	Socorro	LINEAR	THM	5.6 km	MPC · JPL
97531	2000 DD_{28}	—	February 29, 2000	Socorro	LINEAR	·	5.4 km	MPC · JPL
97532	2000 DS_{28}	—	February 29, 2000	Socorro	LINEAR	·	4.1 km	MPC · JPL
97533	2000 DW_{29}	—	February 29, 2000	Socorro	LINEAR	·	2.6 km	MPC · JPL
97534	2000 DX_{32}	—	February 29, 2000	Socorro	LINEAR	·	3.8 km	MPC · JPL
97535	2000 DY_{32}	—	February 29, 2000	Socorro	LINEAR	·	5.4 km	MPC · JPL
97536	2000 DK_{34}	—	February 29, 2000	Socorro	LINEAR	·	5.1 km	MPC · JPL
97537	2000 DC_{35}	—	February 29, 2000	Socorro	LINEAR	·	4.9 km	MPC · JPL
97538	2000 DM_{35}	—	February 29, 2000	Socorro	LINEAR	·	4.8 km	MPC · JPL
97539	2000 DF_{39}	—	February 29, 2000	Socorro	LINEAR	·	6.2 km	MPC · JPL
97540	2000 DN_{41}	—	February 29, 2000	Socorro	LINEAR	·	6.6 km	MPC · JPL
97541	2000 DV_{42}	—	February 29, 2000	Socorro	LINEAR	EUP	9.2 km	MPC · JPL
97542	2000 DD_{43}	—	February 29, 2000	Socorro	LINEAR	·	2.8 km	MPC · JPL
97543	2000 DE_{47}	—	February 29, 2000	Socorro	LINEAR	EOS	3.4 km	MPC · JPL
97544	2000 DG_{47}	—	February 29, 2000	Socorro	LINEAR	·	4.2 km	MPC · JPL
97545	2000 DL_{48}	—	February 29, 2000	Socorro	LINEAR	·	3.3 km	MPC · JPL
97546	2000 DE_{52}	—	February 29, 2000	Socorro	LINEAR	THM	7.1 km	MPC · JPL
97547	2000 DL_{55}	—	February 29, 2000	Socorro	LINEAR	·	5.4 km	MPC · JPL
97548	2000 DW_{55}	—	February 29, 2000	Socorro	LINEAR	·	3.3 km	MPC · JPL
97549	2000 DM_{58}	—	February 29, 2000	Socorro	LINEAR	·	3.1 km	MPC · JPL
97550	2000 DT_{59}	—	February 29, 2000	Socorro	LINEAR	·	3.1 km	MPC · JPL
97551	2000 DO_{60}	—	February 29, 2000	Socorro	LINEAR	HYG	4.9 km	MPC · JPL
97552	2000 DQ_{63}	—	February 29, 2000	Socorro	LINEAR	·	8.3 km	MPC · JPL
97553	2000 DC_{64}	—	February 29, 2000	Socorro	LINEAR	·	3.9 km	MPC · JPL
97554	2000 DB_{65}	—	February 29, 2000	Socorro	LINEAR	·	4.3 km	MPC · JPL
97555	2000 DT_{68}	—	February 29, 2000	Socorro	LINEAR	·	4.1 km	MPC · JPL
97556	2000 DK_{69}	—	February 29, 2000	Socorro	LINEAR	EOS	4.1 km	MPC · JPL
97557	2000 DZ_{71}	—	February 29, 2000	Socorro	LINEAR	HYG	7.8 km	MPC · JPL
97558	2000 DB_{73}	—	February 29, 2000	Socorro	LINEAR	THM	6.0 km	MPC · JPL
97559	2000 DW_{75}	—	February 29, 2000	Socorro	LINEAR	V	1.2 km	MPC · JPL
97560	2000 DS_{76}	—	February 29, 2000	Socorro	LINEAR	CYB	7.7 km	MPC · JPL
97561	2000 DQ_{77}	—	February 29, 2000	Socorro	LINEAR	THM	6.4 km	MPC · JPL
97562	2000 DM_{78}	—	February 29, 2000	Socorro	LINEAR	·	7.4 km	MPC · JPL
97563	2000 DS_{82}	—	February 28, 2000	Socorro	LINEAR	AGN	3.1 km	MPC · JPL
97564	2000 DM_{88}	—	February 29, 2000	Socorro	LINEAR	·	5.9 km	MPC · JPL
97565	2000 DN_{91}	—	February 27, 2000	Kitt Peak	Spacewatch	·	6.2 km	MPC · JPL
97566	2000 DG_{93}	—	February 28, 2000	Socorro	LINEAR	·	6.2 km	MPC · JPL
97567	2000 DH_{93}	—	February 28, 2000	Socorro	LINEAR	·	8.5 km	MPC · JPL
97568	2000 DZ_{94}	—	February 28, 2000	Socorro	LINEAR	CYB	8.8 km	MPC · JPL
97569	2000 DJ_{102}	—	February 29, 2000	Socorro	LINEAR	EOS ·	6.6 km	MPC · JPL
97570	2000 DM_{103}	—	February 29, 2000	Socorro	LINEAR	·	6.4 km	MPC · JPL
97571	2000 DS_{103}	—	February 29, 2000	Socorro	LINEAR	·	8.0 km	MPC · JPL
97572	2000 DU_{103}	—	February 29, 2000	Socorro	LINEAR	·	7.5 km	MPC · JPL
97573	2000 DC_{108}	—	February 28, 2000	Socorro	LINEAR	·	11 km	MPC · JPL
97574	2000 DA_{109}	—	February 29, 2000	Socorro	LINEAR	KOR	2.6 km	MPC · JPL
97575	2000 DN_{109}	—	February 29, 2000	Socorro	LINEAR	EOS	4.6 km	MPC · JPL
97576	2000 DK_{110}	—	February 25, 2000	Uccle	T. Pauwels	TIR	6.8 km	MPC · JPL
97577	2000 DQ_{111}	—	February 29, 2000	Socorro	LINEAR	·	4.4 km	MPC · JPL
97578 Jessicabarnes	2000 DP_{116}	Jessicabarnes	February 27, 2000	Catalina	CSS	·	7.4 km	MPC · JPL
97579	2000 EX_{7}	—	March 4, 2000	Farra d'Isonzo	Farra d'Isonzo	·	5.9 km	MPC · JPL
97580	2000 EP_{8}	—	March 3, 2000	Socorro	LINEAR	·	6.6 km	MPC · JPL
97581	2000 EL_{12}	—	March 4, 2000	Socorro	LINEAR	DOR	6.3 km	MPC · JPL
97582 Hijikawa	2000 EP_{15}	Hijikawa	March 6, 2000	Kuma Kogen	A. Nakamura	THM	6.6 km	MPC · JPL
97583	2000 EL_{16}	—	March 3, 2000	Socorro	LINEAR	EOS	5.6 km	MPC · JPL
97584	2000 ET_{24}	—	March 8, 2000	Kitt Peak	Spacewatch	TIR	3.9 km	MPC · JPL
97585	2000 EW_{25}	—	March 8, 2000	Kitt Peak	Spacewatch	HYG	8.0 km	MPC · JPL
97586	2000 EQ_{26}	—	March 8, 2000	Socorro	LINEAR	H	1.2 km	MPC · JPL
97587	2000 EN_{29}	—	March 5, 2000	Socorro	LINEAR	·	6.7 km	MPC · JPL
97588	2000 EL_{33}	—	March 5, 2000	Socorro	LINEAR	HYG	6.8 km	MPC · JPL
97589	2000 EM_{33}	—	March 5, 2000	Socorro	LINEAR	·	4.9 km	MPC · JPL
97590	2000 EQ_{33}	—	March 5, 2000	Socorro	LINEAR	·	2.2 km	MPC · JPL
97591	2000 EP_{34}	—	March 5, 2000	Socorro	LINEAR	·	11 km	MPC · JPL
97592	2000 ER_{34}	—	March 5, 2000	Socorro	LINEAR	slow	8.4 km	MPC · JPL
97593	2000 EA_{36}	—	March 3, 2000	Socorro	LINEAR	NYS	2.8 km	MPC · JPL
97594	2000 ET_{37}	—	March 8, 2000	Socorro	LINEAR	·	10 km	MPC · JPL
97595	2000 EX_{37}	—	March 8, 2000	Socorro	LINEAR	HYG	7.3 km	MPC · JPL
97596	2000 EM_{43}	—	March 8, 2000	Socorro	LINEAR	·	6.0 km	MPC · JPL
97597	2000 EV_{50}	—	March 11, 2000	Boca Raton	Segal, B. A.	·	4.5 km	MPC · JPL
97598	2000 EZ_{51}	—	March 3, 2000	Kitt Peak	Spacewatch	·	5.5 km	MPC · JPL
97599	2000 EH_{57}	—	March 8, 2000	Socorro	LINEAR	·	9.5 km	MPC · JPL
97600	2000 EY_{65}	—	March 10, 2000	Socorro	LINEAR	THM	5.5 km	MPC · JPL

== 97601–97700 ==
back to top

Designation			Discovery			Properties		Ref
Permanent	Provisional	Named after	Date	Site	Discoverer(s)	Category	Diam.	Ref
97601	2000 EK_{67}	—	March 10, 2000	Socorro	LINEAR	·	3.6 km	MPC · JPL
97602	2000 EM_{69}	—	March 10, 2000	Socorro	LINEAR	·	7.6 km	MPC · JPL
97603	2000 EG_{76}	—	March 5, 2000	Socorro	LINEAR	EOS	5.6 km	MPC · JPL
97604	2000 EA_{77}	—	March 5, 2000	Socorro	LINEAR	EOS	4.6 km	MPC · JPL
97605	2000 EE_{77}	—	March 5, 2000	Socorro	LINEAR	·	6.1 km	MPC · JPL
97606	2000 EM_{77}	—	March 5, 2000	Socorro	LINEAR	EOS	4.2 km	MPC · JPL
97607	2000 ER_{77}	—	March 5, 2000	Socorro	LINEAR	·	4.6 km	MPC · JPL
97608	2000 EW_{82}	—	March 5, 2000	Socorro	LINEAR	·	7.9 km	MPC · JPL
97609	2000 EY_{85}	—	March 8, 2000	Socorro	LINEAR	PAD	4.8 km	MPC · JPL
97610	2000 EG_{86}	—	March 8, 2000	Socorro	LINEAR	·	6.5 km	MPC · JPL
97611	2000 EW_{86}	—	March 8, 2000	Socorro	LINEAR	·	3.9 km	MPC · JPL
97612	2000 EH_{87}	—	March 8, 2000	Socorro	LINEAR	·	4.2 km	MPC · JPL
97613	2000 EK_{87}	—	March 8, 2000	Socorro	LINEAR	·	5.6 km	MPC · JPL
97614	2000 EF_{88}	—	March 9, 2000	Socorro	LINEAR	·	5.7 km	MPC · JPL
97615	2000 EH_{99}	—	March 12, 2000	Kitt Peak	Spacewatch	·	5.9 km	MPC · JPL
97616	2000 EU_{101}	—	March 14, 2000	Kitt Peak	Spacewatch	·	4.1 km	MPC · JPL
97617	2000 EW_{104}	—	March 11, 2000	Anderson Mesa	LONEOS	·	9.3 km	MPC · JPL
97618	2000 EH_{105}	—	March 11, 2000	Anderson Mesa	LONEOS	·	4.8 km	MPC · JPL
97619	2000 EZ_{107}	—	March 8, 2000	Socorro	LINEAR	·	3.9 km	MPC · JPL
97620	2000 EA_{108}	—	March 8, 2000	Socorro	LINEAR	EOS	4.0 km	MPC · JPL
97621	2000 EE_{111}	—	March 8, 2000	Haleakala	NEAT	·	6.3 km	MPC · JPL
97622	2000 EZ_{117}	—	March 11, 2000	Anderson Mesa	LONEOS	·	6.7 km	MPC · JPL
97623	2000 EL_{118}	—	March 11, 2000	Anderson Mesa	LONEOS	·	8.4 km	MPC · JPL
97624	2000 ES_{120}	—	March 11, 2000	Anderson Mesa	LONEOS	·	7.1 km	MPC · JPL
97625	2000 EC_{121}	—	March 11, 2000	Anderson Mesa	LONEOS	·	2.8 km	MPC · JPL
97626	2000 ED_{124}	—	March 11, 2000	Socorro	LINEAR	THM	6.5 km	MPC · JPL
97627	2000 EB_{128}	—	March 11, 2000	Anderson Mesa	LONEOS	·	8.4 km	MPC · JPL
97628	2000 EW_{133}	—	March 11, 2000	Anderson Mesa	LONEOS	·	1.8 km	MPC · JPL
97629	2000 EW_{135}	—	March 11, 2000	Anderson Mesa	LONEOS	(1118)	8.0 km	MPC · JPL
97630	2000 EC_{137}	—	March 12, 2000	Socorro	LINEAR	·	5.5 km	MPC · JPL
97631 Kentrobinson	2000 ED_{144}	Kentrobinson	March 3, 2000	Anderson Mesa	Wasserman, L. H.	fast	7.1 km	MPC · JPL
97632 Mathewwells	2000 EL_{145}	Mathewwells	March 3, 2000	Catalina	CSS	·	6.6 km	MPC · JPL
97633	2000 EY_{151}	—	March 6, 2000	Haleakala	NEAT	V	1.7 km	MPC · JPL
97634	2000 EQ_{154}	—	March 6, 2000	Haleakala	NEAT	·	5.8 km	MPC · JPL
97635	2000 EB_{155}	—	March 9, 2000	Socorro	LINEAR	TIR	5.9 km	MPC · JPL
97636	2000 EC_{155}	—	March 9, 2000	Socorro	LINEAR	·	6.2 km	MPC · JPL
97637 Blennert	2000 EQ_{156}	Blennert	March 10, 2000	Catalina	CSS	·	8.3 km	MPC · JPL
97638	2000 EO_{161}	—	March 3, 2000	Socorro	LINEAR	ANF	3.2 km	MPC · JPL
97639	2000 EN_{163}	—	March 3, 2000	Socorro	LINEAR	·	5.5 km	MPC · JPL
97640	2000 EN_{165}	—	March 3, 2000	Socorro	LINEAR	HYG	6.2 km	MPC · JPL
97641	2000 EU_{169}	—	March 4, 2000	Socorro	LINEAR	·	5.7 km	MPC · JPL
97642	2000 EF_{170}	—	March 5, 2000	Socorro	LINEAR	·	7.4 km	MPC · JPL
97643	2000 EG_{170}	—	March 5, 2000	Socorro	LINEAR	EOS	3.7 km	MPC · JPL
97644	2000 ET_{171}	—	March 5, 2000	Socorro	LINEAR	VER	8.1 km	MPC · JPL
97645	2000 EK_{183}	—	March 5, 2000	Socorro	LINEAR	·	4.2 km	MPC · JPL
97646 Karifigueroa	2000 EK_{198}	Karifigueroa	March 1, 2000	Catalina	CSS	·	8.5 km	MPC · JPL
97647	2000 EG_{201}	—	March 5, 2000	Xinglong	SCAP	·	4.3 km	MPC · JPL
97648	2000 FU	—	March 26, 2000	Socorro	LINEAR	H	1.1 km	MPC · JPL
97649	2000 FK_{1}	—	March 26, 2000	Socorro	LINEAR	H	1.3 km	MPC · JPL
97650	2000 FN_{2}	—	March 25, 2000	Kitt Peak	Spacewatch	HYG	5.2 km	MPC · JPL
97651	2000 FQ_{3}	—	March 28, 2000	Socorro	LINEAR	·	4.3 km	MPC · JPL
97652	2000 FV_{7}	—	March 29, 2000	Socorro	LINEAR	·	6.6 km	MPC · JPL
97653	2000 FH_{13}	—	March 29, 2000	Socorro	LINEAR	CYB	9.2 km	MPC · JPL
97654	2000 FR_{17}	—	March 29, 2000	Socorro	LINEAR	VER	7.0 km	MPC · JPL
97655	2000 FZ_{17}	—	March 29, 2000	Socorro	LINEAR	·	4.9 km	MPC · JPL
97656	2000 FS_{19}	—	March 29, 2000	Socorro	LINEAR	·	4.3 km	MPC · JPL
97657	2000 FN_{20}	—	March 29, 2000	Socorro	LINEAR	·	4.1 km	MPC · JPL
97658	2000 FC_{22}	—	March 29, 2000	Socorro	LINEAR	EOS	4.2 km	MPC · JPL
97659	2000 FF_{22}	—	March 29, 2000	Socorro	LINEAR	·	6.3 km	MPC · JPL
97660	2000 FC_{24}	—	March 29, 2000	Socorro	LINEAR	·	8.9 km	MPC · JPL
97661	2000 FN_{24}	—	March 29, 2000	Socorro	LINEAR	·	2.9 km	MPC · JPL
97662	2000 FD_{26}	—	March 27, 2000	Anderson Mesa	LONEOS	HYG	6.5 km	MPC · JPL
97663	2000 FU_{29}	—	March 27, 2000	Anderson Mesa	LONEOS	·	1.2 km	MPC · JPL
97664	2000 FK_{31}	—	March 28, 2000	Socorro	LINEAR	·	2.9 km	MPC · JPL
97665	2000 FL_{32}	—	March 29, 2000	Socorro	LINEAR	·	5.8 km	MPC · JPL
97666	2000 FJ_{33}	—	March 29, 2000	Socorro	LINEAR	·	5.0 km	MPC · JPL
97667	2000 FZ_{37}	—	March 29, 2000	Socorro	LINEAR	·	7.8 km	MPC · JPL
97668	2000 FG_{39}	—	March 29, 2000	Socorro	LINEAR	THM	7.7 km	MPC · JPL
97669	2000 FL_{40}	—	March 29, 2000	Socorro	LINEAR	EOS	4.3 km	MPC · JPL
97670	2000 FN_{42}	—	March 30, 2000	Socorro	LINEAR	H	1.2 km	MPC · JPL
97671	2000 FT_{46}	—	March 29, 2000	Socorro	LINEAR	·	3.0 km	MPC · JPL
97672	2000 FW_{46}	—	March 29, 2000	Socorro	LINEAR	LIX	7.2 km	MPC · JPL
97673	2000 FW_{47}	—	March 29, 2000	Socorro	LINEAR	EOS	6.0 km	MPC · JPL
97674	2000 FJ_{50}	—	March 31, 2000	Kvistaberg	Uppsala-DLR Asteroid Survey	·	3.4 km	MPC · JPL
97675	2000 FG_{55}	—	March 29, 2000	Kitt Peak	Spacewatch	HYG	5.5 km	MPC · JPL
97676	2000 FW_{56}	—	March 29, 2000	Socorro	LINEAR	·	8.7 km	MPC · JPL
97677 Rachelfreed	2000 FE_{57}	Rachelfreed	March 30, 2000	Catalina	CSS	·	5.6 km	MPC · JPL
97678	2000 GS_{1}	—	April 4, 2000	Prescott	P. G. Comba	HYG	6.4 km	MPC · JPL
97679	2000 GG_{2}	—	April 3, 2000	Socorro	LINEAR	·	1.4 km	MPC · JPL
97680	2000 GM_{7}	—	April 4, 2000	Socorro	LINEAR	ERI	4.5 km	MPC · JPL
97681	2000 GA_{9}	—	April 5, 2000	Socorro	LINEAR	·	4.0 km	MPC · JPL
97682	2000 GC_{10}	—	April 5, 2000	Socorro	LINEAR	·	7.0 km	MPC · JPL
97683	2000 GV_{12}	—	April 5, 2000	Socorro	LINEAR	·	1.8 km	MPC · JPL
97684	2000 GZ_{16}	—	April 5, 2000	Socorro	LINEAR	THM	6.9 km	MPC · JPL
97685	2000 GD_{17}	—	April 5, 2000	Socorro	LINEAR	·	3.4 km	MPC · JPL
97686	2000 GK_{20}	—	April 5, 2000	Socorro	LINEAR	·	7.9 km	MPC · JPL
97687	2000 GN_{20}	—	April 5, 2000	Socorro	LINEAR	THM	5.5 km	MPC · JPL
97688	2000 GX_{22}	—	April 5, 2000	Socorro	LINEAR	·	8.6 km	MPC · JPL
97689	2000 GE_{26}	—	April 5, 2000	Socorro	LINEAR	·	5.5 km	MPC · JPL
97690	2000 GO_{28}	—	April 5, 2000	Socorro	LINEAR	VER	7.8 km	MPC · JPL
97691	2000 GL_{31}	—	April 5, 2000	Socorro	LINEAR	HYG	6.7 km	MPC · JPL
97692	2000 GO_{36}	—	April 5, 2000	Socorro	LINEAR	·	6.0 km	MPC · JPL
97693	2000 GX_{45}	—	April 5, 2000	Socorro	LINEAR	·	6.0 km	MPC · JPL
97694	2000 GD_{46}	—	April 5, 2000	Socorro	LINEAR	HYG	6.1 km	MPC · JPL
97695	2000 GK_{49}	—	April 5, 2000	Socorro	LINEAR	·	7.7 km	MPC · JPL
97696	2000 GR_{50}	—	April 5, 2000	Socorro	LINEAR	·	3.9 km	MPC · JPL
97697	2000 GF_{52}	—	April 5, 2000	Socorro	LINEAR	·	6.5 km	MPC · JPL
97698	2000 GX_{52}	—	April 5, 2000	Socorro	LINEAR	HYG	5.3 km	MPC · JPL
97699	2000 GP_{57}	—	April 5, 2000	Socorro	LINEAR	·	1.3 km	MPC · JPL
97700	2000 GU_{62}	—	April 5, 2000	Socorro	LINEAR	3:2 · SHU	10 km	MPC · JPL

== 97701–97800 ==
back to top

Designation			Discovery			Properties		Ref
Permanent	Provisional	Named after	Date	Site	Discoverer(s)	Category	Diam.	Ref
97701	2000 GR_{66}	—	April 5, 2000	Socorro	LINEAR	·	2.3 km	MPC · JPL
97702	2000 GG_{67}	—	April 5, 2000	Socorro	LINEAR	·	6.6 km	MPC · JPL
97703	2000 GS_{69}	—	April 5, 2000	Socorro	LINEAR	·	2.1 km	MPC · JPL
97704	2000 GB_{76}	—	April 5, 2000	Socorro	LINEAR	·	6.3 km	MPC · JPL
97705	2000 GM_{77}	—	April 5, 2000	Socorro	LINEAR	·	5.8 km	MPC · JPL
97706	2000 GQ_{81}	—	April 6, 2000	Socorro	LINEAR	THM	4.5 km	MPC · JPL
97707	2000 GP_{83}	—	April 3, 2000	Socorro	LINEAR	VER	4.8 km	MPC · JPL
97708	2000 GZ_{84}	—	April 3, 2000	Socorro	LINEAR	·	4.2 km	MPC · JPL
97709	2000 GE_{85}	—	April 3, 2000	Socorro	LINEAR	·	4.2 km	MPC · JPL
97710	2000 GU_{85}	—	April 3, 2000	Socorro	LINEAR	·	2.6 km	MPC · JPL
97711	2000 GD_{86}	—	April 4, 2000	Socorro	LINEAR	EMA	8.2 km	MPC · JPL
97712	2000 GD_{87}	—	April 4, 2000	Socorro	LINEAR	·	8.5 km	MPC · JPL
97713	2000 GS_{88}	—	April 4, 2000	Socorro	LINEAR	·	9.5 km	MPC · JPL
97714	2000 GU_{90}	—	April 4, 2000	Socorro	LINEAR	HYG	9.1 km	MPC · JPL
97715	2000 GN_{92}	—	April 5, 2000	Socorro	LINEAR	THM	5.5 km	MPC · JPL
97716	2000 GC_{100}	—	April 7, 2000	Socorro	LINEAR	·	7.2 km	MPC · JPL
97717	2000 GX_{102}	—	April 7, 2000	Socorro	LINEAR	HYG ·	6.6 km	MPC · JPL
97718	2000 GU_{107}	—	April 7, 2000	Socorro	LINEAR	·	4.0 km	MPC · JPL
97719	2000 GW_{113}	—	April 7, 2000	Socorro	LINEAR	·	9.7 km	MPC · JPL
97720	2000 GF_{115}	—	April 8, 2000	Socorro	LINEAR	·	3.5 km	MPC · JPL
97721	2000 GU_{115}	—	April 8, 2000	Socorro	LINEAR	THM	7.2 km	MPC · JPL
97722	2000 GE_{128}	—	April 3, 2000	Kitt Peak	Spacewatch	·	3.9 km	MPC · JPL
97723	2000 GD_{137}	—	April 12, 2000	Socorro	LINEAR	·	7.4 km	MPC · JPL
97724	2000 GN_{138}	—	April 4, 2000	Anderson Mesa	LONEOS	CYB	11 km	MPC · JPL
97725	2000 GB_{147}	—	April 2, 2000	Mauna Kea	D. J. Tholen, Whiteley, R. J.	AMO	630 m	MPC · JPL
97726	2000 GE_{161}	—	April 7, 2000	Anderson Mesa	LONEOS	·	6.3 km	MPC · JPL
97727	2000 GG_{163}	—	April 9, 2000	Anderson Mesa	LONEOS	·	5.3 km	MPC · JPL
97728	2000 GV_{165}	—	April 5, 2000	Socorro	LINEAR	·	3.8 km	MPC · JPL
97729	2000 GF_{166}	—	April 5, 2000	Socorro	LINEAR	·	7.0 km	MPC · JPL
97730	2000 GA_{169}	—	April 4, 2000	Socorro	LINEAR	·	8.4 km	MPC · JPL
97731	2000 GO_{169}	—	April 2, 2000	Anderson Mesa	LONEOS	·	5.7 km	MPC · JPL
97732	2000 GL_{171}	—	April 5, 2000	Anderson Mesa	LONEOS	·	6.1 km	MPC · JPL
97733	2000 GA_{174}	—	April 5, 2000	Anderson Mesa	LONEOS	·	6.8 km	MPC · JPL
97734	2000 HB_{5}	—	April 27, 2000	Socorro	LINEAR	H	1.2 km	MPC · JPL
97735	2000 HD_{12}	—	April 28, 2000	Socorro	LINEAR	·	2.9 km	MPC · JPL
97736	2000 HT_{21}	—	April 28, 2000	Socorro	LINEAR	·	1.4 km	MPC · JPL
97737	2000 HX_{27}	—	April 28, 2000	Socorro	LINEAR	H	1.3 km	MPC · JPL
97738	2000 HK_{28}	—	April 29, 2000	Socorro	LINEAR	EUP	6.9 km	MPC · JPL
97739	2000 HP_{28}	—	April 29, 2000	Socorro	LINEAR	H	1.8 km	MPC · JPL
97740	2000 HM_{30}	—	April 28, 2000	Socorro	LINEAR	·	3.4 km	MPC · JPL
97741	2000 HP_{33}	—	April 30, 2000	Socorro	LINEAR	H	1.2 km	MPC · JPL
97742	2000 HF_{34}	—	April 25, 2000	Anderson Mesa	LONEOS	·	6.5 km	MPC · JPL
97743	2000 HQ_{42}	—	April 29, 2000	Socorro	LINEAR	·	5.8 km	MPC · JPL
97744	2000 HL_{43}	—	April 29, 2000	Socorro	LINEAR	·	6.0 km	MPC · JPL
97745	2000 HO_{43}	—	April 29, 2000	Kitt Peak	Spacewatch	·	1.0 km	MPC · JPL
97746	2000 HQ_{52}	—	April 29, 2000	Socorro	LINEAR	·	1.8 km	MPC · JPL
97747	2000 HC_{74}	—	April 29, 2000	Socorro	LINEAR	·	9.9 km	MPC · JPL
97748	2000 HF_{79}	—	April 28, 2000	Anderson Mesa	LONEOS	LUT	9.5 km	MPC · JPL
97749	2000 HS_{83}	—	April 30, 2000	Anderson Mesa	LONEOS	·	3.2 km	MPC · JPL
97750	2000 HX_{83}	—	April 30, 2000	Anderson Mesa	LONEOS	·	9.4 km	MPC · JPL
97751	2000 HF_{84}	—	April 30, 2000	Anderson Mesa	LONEOS	TIR	3.9 km	MPC · JPL
97752	2000 HH_{86}	—	April 30, 2000	Anderson Mesa	LONEOS	·	1.8 km	MPC · JPL
97753	2000 HY_{94}	—	April 29, 2000	Anderson Mesa	LONEOS	·	7.9 km	MPC · JPL
97754	2000 HJ_{96}	—	April 28, 2000	Anderson Mesa	LONEOS	·	2.8 km	MPC · JPL
97755	2000 HN_{99}	—	April 26, 2000	Anderson Mesa	LONEOS	WAT	4.4 km	MPC · JPL
97756	2000 JY	—	May 1, 2000	Socorro	LINEAR	H	1.7 km	MPC · JPL
97757	2000 JC_{3}	—	May 2, 2000	Socorro	LINEAR	H	1.3 km	MPC · JPL
97758	2000 JY_{5}	—	May 2, 2000	Socorro	LINEAR	TIR ·	7.4 km	MPC · JPL
97759	2000 JJ_{10}	—	May 6, 2000	Socorro	LINEAR	H	1.2 km	MPC · JPL
97760	2000 JT_{12}	—	May 6, 2000	Socorro	LINEAR	·	6.0 km	MPC · JPL
97761	2000 JE_{15}	—	May 6, 2000	Socorro	LINEAR	·	4.5 km	MPC · JPL
97762	2000 JP_{20}	—	May 6, 2000	Socorro	LINEAR	(58892)	9.4 km	MPC · JPL
97763	2000 JO_{21}	—	May 6, 2000	Socorro	LINEAR	·	6.8 km	MPC · JPL
97764	2000 JO_{22}	—	May 6, 2000	Socorro	LINEAR	EUN	2.3 km	MPC · JPL
97765	2000 JN_{27}	—	May 7, 2000	Socorro	LINEAR	WAT	5.2 km	MPC · JPL
97766	2000 JB_{30}	—	May 7, 2000	Socorro	LINEAR	·	6.8 km	MPC · JPL
97767	2000 JB_{46}	—	May 7, 2000	Socorro	LINEAR	·	4.6 km	MPC · JPL
97768	2000 JP_{69}	—	May 2, 2000	Socorro	LINEAR	TIR	9.1 km	MPC · JPL
97769	2000 JS_{70}	—	May 1, 2000	Anderson Mesa	LONEOS	EOS	5.5 km	MPC · JPL
97770	2000 JJ_{72}	—	May 1, 2000	Kitt Peak	Spacewatch	DOR	6.8 km	MPC · JPL
97771	2000 JX_{72}	—	May 2, 2000	Anderson Mesa	LONEOS	DOR	5.8 km	MPC · JPL
97772	2000 JZ_{79}	—	May 6, 2000	Socorro	LINEAR	·	9.1 km	MPC · JPL
97773	2000 JY_{80}	—	May 1, 2000	Anderson Mesa	LONEOS	·	5.2 km	MPC · JPL
97774	2000 KK_{1}	—	May 26, 2000	Socorro	LINEAR	H	1.3 km	MPC · JPL
97775	2000 KN_{2}	—	May 26, 2000	Socorro	LINEAR	EUP	7.6 km	MPC · JPL
97776	2000 KY_{10}	—	May 28, 2000	Socorro	LINEAR	·	4.3 km	MPC · JPL
97777	2000 KG_{16}	—	May 28, 2000	Socorro	LINEAR	THM	5.3 km	MPC · JPL
97778	2000 KG_{41}	—	May 31, 2000	Prescott	P. G. Comba	·	1.4 km	MPC · JPL
97779	2000 KA_{67}	—	May 30, 2000	Socorro	LINEAR	H	1.6 km	MPC · JPL
97780	2000 KW_{67}	—	May 30, 2000	Socorro	LINEAR	·	7.7 km	MPC · JPL
97781	2000 KE_{73}	—	May 28, 2000	Anderson Mesa	LONEOS	·	3.2 km	MPC · JPL
97782	2000 KJ_{73}	—	May 28, 2000	Anderson Mesa	LONEOS	·	1.8 km	MPC · JPL
97783	2000 KL_{76}	—	May 27, 2000	Socorro	LINEAR	·	2.9 km	MPC · JPL
97784	2000 KK_{81}	—	May 26, 2000	Socorro	LINEAR	H	1.3 km	MPC · JPL
97785	2000 NZ_{1}	—	July 5, 2000	Reedy Creek	J. Broughton	·	2.0 km	MPC · JPL
97786 Oauam	2000 NU_{2}	Oauam	July 5, 2000	Ondřejov	P. Pravec, P. Kušnirák	·	1.9 km	MPC · JPL
97787	2000 NH_{5}	—	July 7, 2000	Socorro	LINEAR	·	3.8 km	MPC · JPL
97788	2000 NP_{5}	—	July 8, 2000	Socorro	LINEAR	·	2.9 km	MPC · JPL
97789	2000 NY_{8}	—	July 7, 2000	Socorro	LINEAR	BAP	3.4 km	MPC · JPL
97790	2000 NB_{9}	—	July 7, 2000	Socorro	LINEAR	NYS	2.7 km	MPC · JPL
97791	2000 ND_{9}	—	July 7, 2000	Socorro	LINEAR	·	2.1 km	MPC · JPL
97792	2000 NG_{10}	—	July 10, 2000	Farpoint	G. Hug	·	2.3 km	MPC · JPL
97793	2000 NJ_{13}	—	July 5, 2000	Anderson Mesa	LONEOS	·	1.6 km	MPC · JPL
97794	2000 NG_{14}	—	July 5, 2000	Anderson Mesa	LONEOS	·	1.6 km	MPC · JPL
97795	2000 NA_{15}	—	July 5, 2000	Anderson Mesa	LONEOS	·	2.0 km	MPC · JPL
97796	2000 NT_{15}	—	July 5, 2000	Anderson Mesa	LONEOS	·	1.9 km	MPC · JPL
97797	2000 NG_{17}	—	July 5, 2000	Anderson Mesa	LONEOS	·	1.8 km	MPC · JPL
97798	2000 NL_{21}	—	July 7, 2000	Socorro	LINEAR	·	2.0 km	MPC · JPL
97799	2000 NE_{23}	—	July 5, 2000	Anderson Mesa	LONEOS	·	1.7 km	MPC · JPL
97800	2000 NO_{23}	—	July 5, 2000	Anderson Mesa	LONEOS	·	2.1 km	MPC · JPL

== 97801–97900 ==
back to top

Designation			Discovery			Properties		Ref
Permanent	Provisional	Named after	Date	Site	Discoverer(s)	Category	Diam.	Ref
97801	2000 NV_{27}	—	July 4, 2000	Anderson Mesa	LONEOS	·	1.9 km	MPC · JPL
97802	2000 NJ_{28}	—	July 3, 2000	Socorro	LINEAR	·	1.4 km	MPC · JPL
97803	2000 OQ_{6}	—	July 29, 2000	Socorro	LINEAR	·	1.8 km	MPC · JPL
97804	2000 OA_{9}	—	July 31, 2000	Socorro	LINEAR	·	3.0 km	MPC · JPL
97805	2000 OJ_{15}	—	July 23, 2000	Socorro	LINEAR	·	1.9 km	MPC · JPL
97806	2000 OH_{18}	—	July 23, 2000	Socorro	LINEAR	(2076)	2.5 km	MPC · JPL
97807	2000 OR_{18}	—	July 23, 2000	Socorro	LINEAR	·	1.3 km	MPC · JPL
97808	2000 OZ_{18}	—	July 23, 2000	Socorro	LINEAR	·	1.7 km	MPC · JPL
97809	2000 OH_{30}	—	July 30, 2000	Socorro	LINEAR	·	1.5 km	MPC · JPL
97810	2000 OM_{30}	—	July 30, 2000	Socorro	LINEAR	·	1.6 km	MPC · JPL
97811	2000 OH_{33}	—	July 30, 2000	Socorro	LINEAR	·	1.5 km	MPC · JPL
97812	2000 OH_{46}	—	July 31, 2000	Socorro	LINEAR	NYS	2.2 km	MPC · JPL
97813	2000 OP_{46}	—	July 31, 2000	Socorro	LINEAR	·	1.7 km	MPC · JPL
97814	2000 OY_{46}	—	July 31, 2000	Socorro	LINEAR	·	1.8 km	MPC · JPL
97815	2000 OA_{48}	—	July 31, 2000	Socorro	LINEAR	PHO	3.6 km	MPC · JPL
97816	2000 OW_{48}	—	July 31, 2000	Socorro	LINEAR	·	2.0 km	MPC · JPL
97817	2000 OY_{48}	—	July 31, 2000	Socorro	LINEAR	·	2.0 km	MPC · JPL
97818	2000 OO_{49}	—	July 31, 2000	Socorro	LINEAR	·	1.8 km	MPC · JPL
97819	2000 OR_{49}	—	July 31, 2000	Socorro	LINEAR	·	1.9 km	MPC · JPL
97820	2000 OZ_{49}	—	July 31, 2000	Socorro	LINEAR	·	1.7 km	MPC · JPL
97821	2000 OV_{50}	—	July 31, 2000	Socorro	LINEAR	·	2.5 km	MPC · JPL
97822	2000 OG_{53}	—	July 30, 2000	Socorro	LINEAR	·	1.8 km	MPC · JPL
97823	2000 OQ_{56}	—	July 29, 2000	Anderson Mesa	LONEOS	·	1.8 km	MPC · JPL
97824	2000 OU_{57}	—	July 29, 2000	Anderson Mesa	LONEOS	·	2.2 km	MPC · JPL
97825	2000 OK_{58}	—	July 29, 2000	Anderson Mesa	LONEOS	·	2.0 km	MPC · JPL
97826	2000 OB_{59}	—	July 29, 2000	Anderson Mesa	LONEOS	·	1.9 km	MPC · JPL
97827	2000 OB_{61}	—	July 30, 2000	Socorro	LINEAR	V	1.6 km	MPC · JPL
97828	2000 OJ_{61}	—	July 31, 2000	Socorro	LINEAR	V	1.8 km	MPC · JPL
97829	2000 PL_{1}	—	August 1, 2000	Socorro	LINEAR	·	1.7 km	MPC · JPL
97830	2000 PA_{4}	—	August 3, 2000	Bisei SG Center	BATTeRS	·	1.5 km	MPC · JPL
97831	2000 PN_{5}	—	August 5, 2000	Prescott	P. G. Comba	·	1.7 km	MPC · JPL
97832	2000 PQ_{5}	—	August 5, 2000	Prescott	P. G. Comba	·	1.6 km	MPC · JPL
97833	2000 PF_{6}	—	August 5, 2000	Haleakala	NEAT	·	1.8 km	MPC · JPL
97834	2000 PN_{6}	—	August 2, 2000	Socorro	LINEAR	PHO	2.2 km	MPC · JPL
97835	2000 PF_{7}	—	August 5, 2000	Bisei SG Center	BATTeRS	·	2.3 km	MPC · JPL
97836	2000 PW_{8}	—	August 9, 2000	Reedy Creek	J. Broughton	·	2.6 km	MPC · JPL
97837	2000 PX_{13}	—	August 1, 2000	Socorro	LINEAR	·	1.9 km	MPC · JPL
97838	2000 PC_{18}	—	August 1, 2000	Socorro	LINEAR	·	4.0 km	MPC · JPL
97839	2000 PQ_{19}	—	August 1, 2000	Socorro	LINEAR	·	1.4 km	MPC · JPL
97840	2000 PS_{19}	—	August 1, 2000	Socorro	LINEAR	·	2.1 km	MPC · JPL
97841	2000 PZ_{20}	—	August 1, 2000	Socorro	LINEAR	·	1.4 km	MPC · JPL
97842	2000 PS_{22}	—	August 2, 2000	Socorro	LINEAR	·	2.3 km	MPC · JPL
97843	2000 PA_{26}	—	August 4, 2000	Haleakala	NEAT	·	3.6 km	MPC · JPL
97844	2000 PE_{27}	—	August 9, 2000	Socorro	LINEAR	·	3.1 km	MPC · JPL
97845	2000 PG_{28}	—	August 4, 2000	Haleakala	NEAT	·	6.0 km	MPC · JPL
97846	2000 PP_{28}	—	August 3, 2000	Socorro	LINEAR	·	3.1 km	MPC · JPL
97847	2000 PV_{28}	—	August 2, 2000	Socorro	LINEAR	·	2.2 km	MPC · JPL
97848	2000 QS_{3}	—	August 24, 2000	Socorro	LINEAR	·	1.2 km	MPC · JPL
97849	2000 QJ_{4}	—	August 24, 2000	Socorro	LINEAR	NYS	2.1 km	MPC · JPL
97850	2000 QT_{4}	—	August 24, 2000	Socorro	LINEAR	·	1.4 km	MPC · JPL
97851	2000 QP_{5}	—	August 24, 2000	Socorro	LINEAR	·	2.3 km	MPC · JPL
97852	2000 QH_{6}	—	August 24, 2000	Višnjan Observatory	K. Korlević, M. Jurić	·	1.7 km	MPC · JPL
97853	2000 QM_{8}	—	August 25, 2000	Višnjan Observatory	K. Korlević, M. Jurić	·	1.8 km	MPC · JPL
97854	2000 QZ_{8}	—	August 25, 2000	Črni Vrh	Mikuž, H.	·	2.4 km	MPC · JPL
97855	2000 QV_{14}	—	August 24, 2000	Socorro	LINEAR	·	4.3 km	MPC · JPL
97856	2000 QB_{18}	—	August 24, 2000	Socorro	LINEAR	·	1.8 km	MPC · JPL
97857	2000 QJ_{20}	—	August 24, 2000	Socorro	LINEAR	·	1.7 km	MPC · JPL
97858	2000 QH_{23}	—	August 25, 2000	Socorro	LINEAR	·	2.4 km	MPC · JPL
97859	2000 QM_{26}	—	August 27, 2000	Needville	Needville	·	2.0 km	MPC · JPL
97860	2000 QR_{26}	—	August 27, 2000	Bisei SG Center	BATTeRS	·	1.9 km	MPC · JPL
97861	2000 QM_{27}	—	August 24, 2000	Socorro	LINEAR	MAS	1.6 km	MPC · JPL
97862	2000 QT_{27}	—	August 24, 2000	Socorro	LINEAR	·	4.3 km	MPC · JPL
97863	2000 QF_{28}	—	August 24, 2000	Socorro	LINEAR	·	2.0 km	MPC · JPL
97864	2000 QS_{28}	—	August 24, 2000	Socorro	LINEAR	·	2.2 km	MPC · JPL
97865	2000 QK_{29}	—	August 24, 2000	Socorro	LINEAR	·	1.5 km	MPC · JPL
97866	2000 QM_{29}	—	August 24, 2000	Socorro	LINEAR	·	3.9 km	MPC · JPL
97867	2000 QJ_{30}	—	August 25, 2000	Socorro	LINEAR	NYS	2.8 km	MPC · JPL
97868	2000 QK_{30}	—	August 25, 2000	Socorro	LINEAR	·	1.8 km	MPC · JPL
97869	2000 QS_{32}	—	August 26, 2000	Socorro	LINEAR	·	2.8 km	MPC · JPL
97870	2000 QX_{32}	—	August 26, 2000	Socorro	LINEAR	V	1.2 km	MPC · JPL
97871	2000 QG_{33}	—	August 26, 2000	Socorro	LINEAR	·	2.7 km	MPC · JPL
97872	2000 QG_{35}	—	August 28, 2000	Reedy Creek	J. Broughton	·	3.0 km	MPC · JPL
97873	2000 QN_{36}	—	August 24, 2000	Socorro	LINEAR	·	1.7 km	MPC · JPL
97874	2000 QB_{38}	—	August 24, 2000	Socorro	LINEAR	·	1.9 km	MPC · JPL
97875	2000 QL_{39}	—	August 24, 2000	Socorro	LINEAR	·	2.0 km	MPC · JPL
97876	2000 QG_{41}	—	August 24, 2000	Socorro	LINEAR	·	3.7 km	MPC · JPL
97877	2000 QO_{41}	—	August 24, 2000	Socorro	LINEAR	·	2.7 km	MPC · JPL
97878	2000 QL_{43}	—	August 24, 2000	Socorro	LINEAR	·	1.7 km	MPC · JPL
97879	2000 QW_{43}	—	August 24, 2000	Socorro	LINEAR	·	1.9 km	MPC · JPL
97880	2000 QO_{45}	—	August 24, 2000	Socorro	LINEAR	·	1.8 km	MPC · JPL
97881	2000 QR_{45}	—	August 24, 2000	Socorro	LINEAR	·	2.0 km	MPC · JPL
97882	2000 QW_{45}	—	August 24, 2000	Socorro	LINEAR	NYS	3.0 km	MPC · JPL
97883	2000 QT_{50}	—	August 24, 2000	Socorro	LINEAR	·	1.9 km	MPC · JPL
97884	2000 QA_{51}	—	August 24, 2000	Socorro	LINEAR	·	1.4 km	MPC · JPL
97885	2000 QY_{53}	—	August 25, 2000	Socorro	LINEAR	·	2.2 km	MPC · JPL
97886	2000 QK_{54}	—	August 25, 2000	Socorro	LINEAR	·	1.9 km	MPC · JPL
97887	2000 QP_{54}	—	August 31, 2000	Socorro	LINEAR	·	1.6 km	MPC · JPL
97888	2000 QC_{56}	—	August 26, 2000	Socorro	LINEAR	·	1.8 km	MPC · JPL
97889	2000 QO_{56}	—	August 26, 2000	Socorro	LINEAR	·	1.7 km	MPC · JPL
97890	2000 QM_{58}	—	August 26, 2000	Socorro	LINEAR	·	2.0 km	MPC · JPL
97891	2000 QY_{60}	—	August 26, 2000	Socorro	LINEAR	·	1.5 km	MPC · JPL
97892	2000 QH_{63}	—	August 28, 2000	Socorro	LINEAR	·	1.6 km	MPC · JPL
97893	2000 QV_{65}	—	August 28, 2000	Socorro	LINEAR	L5	18 km	MPC · JPL
97894	2000 QG_{68}	—	August 28, 2000	Socorro	LINEAR	V	1.3 km	MPC · JPL
97895	2000 QY_{71}	—	August 24, 2000	Socorro	LINEAR	·	3.3 km	MPC · JPL
97896	2000 QN_{72}	—	August 24, 2000	Socorro	LINEAR	·	1.3 km	MPC · JPL
97897	2000 QT_{73}	—	August 24, 2000	Socorro	LINEAR	NYS	2.0 km	MPC · JPL
97898	2000 QC_{74}	—	August 24, 2000	Socorro	LINEAR	·	2.1 km	MPC · JPL
97899	2000 QO_{74}	—	August 24, 2000	Socorro	LINEAR	NYS	2.1 km	MPC · JPL
97900	2000 QF_{75}	—	August 24, 2000	Socorro	LINEAR	·	1.8 km	MPC · JPL

== 97901–98000 ==
back to top

Designation			Discovery			Properties		Ref
Permanent	Provisional	Named after	Date	Site	Discoverer(s)	Category	Diam.	Ref
97901	2000 QT_{75}	—	August 24, 2000	Socorro	LINEAR	V	1.2 km	MPC · JPL
97902	2000 QS_{76}	—	August 24, 2000	Socorro	LINEAR	·	2.4 km	MPC · JPL
97903	2000 QM_{79}	—	August 24, 2000	Socorro	LINEAR	·	2.9 km	MPC · JPL
97904	2000 QV_{79}	—	August 24, 2000	Socorro	LINEAR	MAS	1.6 km	MPC · JPL
97905	2000 QY_{79}	—	August 24, 2000	Socorro	LINEAR	NYS ·	3.7 km	MPC · JPL
97906	2000 QA_{80}	—	August 24, 2000	Socorro	LINEAR	·	3.0 km	MPC · JPL
97907	2000 QF_{80}	—	August 24, 2000	Socorro	LINEAR	·	2.2 km	MPC · JPL
97908	2000 QA_{81}	—	August 24, 2000	Socorro	LINEAR	·	3.7 km	MPC · JPL
97909	2000 QY_{81}	—	August 24, 2000	Socorro	LINEAR	·	1.3 km	MPC · JPL
97910	2000 QW_{82}	—	August 24, 2000	Socorro	LINEAR	NYS	2.2 km	MPC · JPL
97911	2000 QE_{85}	—	August 25, 2000	Socorro	LINEAR	·	1.8 km	MPC · JPL
97912	2000 QK_{88}	—	August 25, 2000	Socorro	LINEAR	·	2.9 km	MPC · JPL
97913	2000 QW_{88}	—	August 25, 2000	Socorro	LINEAR	V	1.1 km	MPC · JPL
97914	2000 QK_{90}	—	August 25, 2000	Socorro	LINEAR	·	1.9 km	MPC · JPL
97915	2000 QX_{90}	—	August 25, 2000	Socorro	LINEAR	(883)	1.8 km	MPC · JPL
97916	2000 QE_{91}	—	August 25, 2000	Socorro	LINEAR	·	2.5 km	MPC · JPL
97917	2000 QB_{95}	—	August 26, 2000	Socorro	LINEAR	·	3.1 km	MPC · JPL
97918	2000 QE_{95}	—	August 26, 2000	Socorro	LINEAR	NYS	2.5 km	MPC · JPL
97919	2000 QB_{96}	—	August 28, 2000	Socorro	LINEAR	·	2.4 km	MPC · JPL
97920	2000 QD_{96}	—	August 28, 2000	Socorro	LINEAR	·	1.8 km	MPC · JPL
97921	2000 QE_{96}	—	August 28, 2000	Socorro	LINEAR	·	2.4 km	MPC · JPL
97922	2000 QF_{96}	—	August 28, 2000	Socorro	LINEAR	·	2.1 km	MPC · JPL
97923	2000 QY_{96}	—	August 28, 2000	Socorro	LINEAR	·	2.7 km	MPC · JPL
97924	2000 QJ_{97}	—	August 28, 2000	Socorro	LINEAR	·	1.5 km	MPC · JPL
97925	2000 QL_{98}	—	August 28, 2000	Socorro	LINEAR	·	2.2 km	MPC · JPL
97926	2000 QO_{99}	—	August 28, 2000	Socorro	LINEAR	·	2.1 km	MPC · JPL
97927	2000 QA_{100}	—	August 28, 2000	Socorro	LINEAR	·	2.4 km	MPC · JPL
97928	2000 QA_{101}	—	August 28, 2000	Socorro	LINEAR	V	1.9 km	MPC · JPL
97929	2000 QB_{105}	—	August 28, 2000	Socorro	LINEAR	·	2.4 km	MPC · JPL
97930	2000 QR_{105}	—	August 28, 2000	Socorro	LINEAR	·	1.8 km	MPC · JPL
97931	2000 QL_{108}	—	August 29, 2000	Socorro	LINEAR	(2076)	3.6 km	MPC · JPL
97932	2000 QT_{108}	—	August 29, 2000	Socorro	LINEAR	·	1.9 km	MPC · JPL
97933	2000 QW_{113}	—	August 24, 2000	Socorro	LINEAR	·	1.8 km	MPC · JPL
97934	2000 QD_{114}	—	August 24, 2000	Socorro	LINEAR	V	1.4 km	MPC · JPL
97935	2000 QJ_{115}	—	August 25, 2000	Socorro	LINEAR	·	1.7 km	MPC · JPL
97936	2000 QS_{115}	—	August 25, 2000	Socorro	LINEAR	·	1.4 km	MPC · JPL
97937	2000 QL_{116}	—	August 28, 2000	Socorro	LINEAR	·	4.6 km	MPC · JPL
97938	2000 QO_{116}	—	August 28, 2000	Socorro	LINEAR	·	1.9 km	MPC · JPL
97939	2000 QP_{116}	—	August 28, 2000	Socorro	LINEAR	·	2.2 km	MPC · JPL
97940	2000 QW_{116}	—	August 28, 2000	Socorro	LINEAR	·	1.6 km	MPC · JPL
97941	2000 QW_{117}	—	August 29, 2000	Črni Vrh	H. Mikuž, S. Matičič	·	1.8 km	MPC · JPL
97942	2000 QC_{118}	—	August 25, 2000	Socorro	LINEAR	·	1.5 km	MPC · JPL
97943	2000 QQ_{118}	—	August 25, 2000	Socorro	LINEAR	·	1.6 km	MPC · JPL
97944	2000 QM_{119}	—	August 25, 2000	Socorro	LINEAR	·	2.8 km	MPC · JPL
97945	2000 QN_{120}	—	August 25, 2000	Socorro	LINEAR	·	2.9 km	MPC · JPL
97946	2000 QS_{122}	—	August 25, 2000	Socorro	LINEAR	·	2.2 km	MPC · JPL
97947	2000 QC_{123}	—	August 25, 2000	Socorro	LINEAR	ERI	4.5 km	MPC · JPL
97948	2000 QF_{124}	—	August 26, 2000	Socorro	LINEAR	·	1.5 km	MPC · JPL
97949	2000 QN_{127}	—	August 24, 2000	Socorro	LINEAR	·	2.3 km	MPC · JPL
97950	2000 QO_{127}	—	August 24, 2000	Socorro	LINEAR	NYS	1.8 km	MPC · JPL
97951	2000 QU_{127}	—	August 24, 2000	Socorro	LINEAR	·	3.5 km	MPC · JPL
97952	2000 QN_{128}	—	August 25, 2000	Socorro	LINEAR	·	2.1 km	MPC · JPL
97953	2000 QR_{129}	—	August 30, 2000	Višnjan Observatory	K. Korlević	·	2.7 km	MPC · JPL
97954	2000 QY_{130}	—	August 24, 2000	Socorro	LINEAR	·	6.2 km	MPC · JPL
97955	2000 QB_{133}	—	August 26, 2000	Socorro	LINEAR	·	1.8 km	MPC · JPL
97956	2000 QA_{135}	—	August 26, 2000	Socorro	LINEAR	·	3.9 km	MPC · JPL
97957	2000 QB_{135}	—	August 26, 2000	Socorro	LINEAR	·	1.5 km	MPC · JPL
97958	2000 QR_{137}	—	August 31, 2000	Socorro	LINEAR	·	2.4 km	MPC · JPL
97959	2000 QM_{140}	—	August 31, 2000	Socorro	LINEAR	·	1.8 km	MPC · JPL
97960	2000 QQ_{140}	—	August 31, 2000	Socorro	LINEAR	MAS	1.9 km	MPC · JPL
97961	2000 QY_{140}	—	August 31, 2000	Socorro	LINEAR	·	2.4 km	MPC · JPL
97962	2000 QC_{141}	—	August 31, 2000	Socorro	LINEAR	HNS	3.0 km	MPC · JPL
97963	2000 QO_{141}	—	August 31, 2000	Socorro	LINEAR	V	1.3 km	MPC · JPL
97964	2000 QD_{143}	—	August 31, 2000	Socorro	LINEAR	NYS	1.3 km	MPC · JPL
97965	2000 QW_{143}	—	August 31, 2000	Socorro	LINEAR	PHO	2.1 km	MPC · JPL
97966	2000 QN_{145}	—	August 31, 2000	Socorro	LINEAR	V	1.8 km	MPC · JPL
97967	2000 QP_{146}	—	August 31, 2000	Socorro	LINEAR	·	1.7 km	MPC · JPL
97968	2000 QT_{149}	—	August 25, 2000	Socorro	LINEAR	V	1.2 km	MPC · JPL
97969	2000 QE_{150}	—	August 25, 2000	Socorro	LINEAR	·	2.5 km	MPC · JPL
97970	2000 QO_{150}	—	August 25, 2000	Socorro	LINEAR	·	2.5 km	MPC · JPL
97971	2000 QR_{150}	—	August 25, 2000	Socorro	LINEAR	·	2.3 km	MPC · JPL
97972	2000 QV_{151}	—	August 26, 2000	Socorro	LINEAR	·	1.8 km	MPC · JPL
97973	2000 QB_{165}	—	August 31, 2000	Socorro	LINEAR	L5	16 km	MPC · JPL
97974	2000 QD_{167}	—	August 31, 2000	Socorro	LINEAR	·	1.9 km	MPC · JPL
97975	2000 QG_{168}	—	August 31, 2000	Socorro	LINEAR	·	2.3 km	MPC · JPL
97976	2000 QL_{168}	—	August 31, 2000	Socorro	LINEAR	V	1.4 km	MPC · JPL
97977	2000 QO_{169}	—	August 31, 2000	Socorro	LINEAR	V	1.3 km	MPC · JPL
97978	2000 QS_{169}	—	August 31, 2000	Socorro	LINEAR	V	1.7 km	MPC · JPL
97979	2000 QN_{170}	—	August 31, 2000	Socorro	LINEAR	·	1.7 km	MPC · JPL
97980	2000 QQ_{170}	—	August 31, 2000	Socorro	LINEAR	·	1.3 km	MPC · JPL
97981	2000 QH_{171}	—	August 31, 2000	Socorro	LINEAR	·	1.7 km	MPC · JPL
97982	2000 QT_{171}	—	August 31, 2000	Socorro	LINEAR	·	2.6 km	MPC · JPL
97983	2000 QH_{172}	—	August 31, 2000	Socorro	LINEAR	·	2.1 km	MPC · JPL
97984	2000 QZ_{172}	—	August 31, 2000	Socorro	LINEAR	V	1.1 km	MPC · JPL
97985	2000 QR_{173}	—	August 31, 2000	Socorro	LINEAR	·	1.7 km	MPC · JPL
97986	2000 QH_{174}	—	August 31, 2000	Socorro	LINEAR	·	2.5 km	MPC · JPL
97987	2000 QL_{175}	—	August 31, 2000	Socorro	LINEAR	·	1.4 km	MPC · JPL
97988	2000 QN_{178}	—	August 31, 2000	Socorro	LINEAR	V	1.3 km	MPC · JPL
97989	2000 QD_{186}	—	August 26, 2000	Socorro	LINEAR	·	1.8 km	MPC · JPL
97990	2000 QG_{186}	—	August 26, 2000	Socorro	LINEAR	·	2.2 km	MPC · JPL
97991	2000 QS_{186}	—	August 26, 2000	Socorro	LINEAR	·	2.2 km	MPC · JPL
97992	2000 QL_{187}	—	August 26, 2000	Socorro	LINEAR	·	1.5 km	MPC · JPL
97993	2000 QO_{187}	—	August 26, 2000	Socorro	LINEAR	V	1.6 km	MPC · JPL
97994	2000 QV_{187}	—	August 26, 2000	Socorro	LINEAR	·	1.8 km	MPC · JPL
97995	2000 QX_{187}	—	August 26, 2000	Socorro	LINEAR	NYS	2.3 km	MPC · JPL
97996	2000 QG_{189}	—	August 26, 2000	Socorro	LINEAR	V	1.5 km	MPC · JPL
97997	2000 QT_{189}	—	August 26, 2000	Socorro	LINEAR	·	2.6 km	MPC · JPL
97998	2000 QY_{189}	—	August 26, 2000	Socorro	LINEAR	·	1.9 km	MPC · JPL
97999	2000 QN_{190}	—	August 26, 2000	Socorro	LINEAR	·	1.8 km	MPC · JPL
98000	2000 QZ_{197}	—	August 29, 2000	Socorro	LINEAR	·	1.7 km	MPC · JPL

back to top

== See also ==
- Meanings of minor-planet names: 97001–98000
