= List of minor planets: 98001–99000 =

The following is a partial list of minor planets, running from minor-planet number 98001 through 99000, inclusive. The primary data for this and other partial lists is based on JPL's "Small-Body Orbital Elements" and data available from the Minor Planet Center. Critical list information is also provided by the MPC, unless otherwise specified from Lowell Observatory. A detailed description of the table's columns and additional sources are given on the main page including a complete list of every page in this series, and a statistical break-up on the dynamical classification of minor planets.

Also see the summary list of all named bodies in numerical and alphabetical order, and the corresponding naming citations for the number range of this particular list. New namings may only be added to this list after official publication, as the preannouncement of names is condemned by the Working Group for Small Bodies Nomenclature of the International Astronomical Union.

Near-Earth obj.	MBA (inner)	MBA (outer)	Centaur
Mars-crosser	MBA (middle)	Jupiter trojan	Trans-Neptunian obj.
Unclassified

== 98001–98100 ==
Designation			Discovery			Properties		Ref
Permanent	Provisional	Named after	Date	Site	Discoverer(s)	Category	Diam.	Ref
98001	2000 QS_{198}	—	August 29, 2000	Socorro	LINEAR	·	2.0 km	MPC · JPL
98002	2000 QG_{199}	—	August 29, 2000	Socorro	LINEAR	3:2	12 km	MPC · JPL
98003	2000 QH_{199}	—	August 29, 2000	Socorro	LINEAR	·	2.1 km	MPC · JPL
98004	2000 QU_{202}	—	August 29, 2000	Socorro	LINEAR	·	1.7 km	MPC · JPL
98005	2000 QV_{203}	—	August 29, 2000	Socorro	LINEAR	·	1.6 km	MPC · JPL
98006	2000 QC_{205}	—	August 31, 2000	Socorro	LINEAR	NYS	2.1 km	MPC · JPL
98007	2000 QR_{207}	—	August 31, 2000	Socorro	LINEAR	NYS	3.2 km	MPC · JPL
98008	2000 QN_{208}	—	August 31, 2000	Socorro	LINEAR	·	2.1 km	MPC · JPL
98009	2000 QC_{209}	—	August 31, 2000	Socorro	LINEAR	·	1.4 km	MPC · JPL
98010	2000 QW_{210}	—	August 31, 2000	Socorro	LINEAR	NYS	1.8 km	MPC · JPL
98011	2000 QZ_{212}	—	August 31, 2000	Socorro	LINEAR	·	1.6 km	MPC · JPL
98012	2000 QK_{213}	—	August 31, 2000	Socorro	LINEAR	·	1.6 km	MPC · JPL
98013	2000 QX_{214}	—	August 31, 2000	Socorro	LINEAR	·	5.2 km	MPC · JPL
98014	2000 QD_{215}	—	August 31, 2000	Socorro	LINEAR	·	1.6 km	MPC · JPL
98015	2000 QS_{215}	—	August 31, 2000	Socorro	LINEAR	·	1.6 km	MPC · JPL
98016	2000 QA_{223}	—	August 21, 2000	Anderson Mesa	LONEOS	·	1.8 km	MPC · JPL
98017	2000 QM_{224}	—	August 26, 2000	Kitt Peak	Spacewatch	·	4.1 km	MPC · JPL
98018	2000 QT_{227}	—	August 31, 2000	Socorro	LINEAR	·	2.2 km	MPC · JPL
98019	2000 QH_{228}	—	August 31, 2000	Socorro	LINEAR	·	1.9 km	MPC · JPL
98020	2000 QL_{229}	—	August 31, 2000	Socorro	LINEAR	·	2.9 km	MPC · JPL
98021	2000 QX_{243}	—	August 24, 2000	Socorro	LINEAR	·	1.7 km	MPC · JPL
98022	2000 QC_{246}	—	August 26, 2000	Socorro	LINEAR	·	1.6 km	MPC · JPL
98023	2000 QG_{251}	—	August 21, 2000	Anderson Mesa	LONEOS	·	1.7 km	MPC · JPL
98024	2000 RP_{1}	—	September 1, 2000	Socorro	LINEAR	·	4.3 km	MPC · JPL
98025	2000 RE_{2}	—	September 1, 2000	Socorro	LINEAR	·	1.9 km	MPC · JPL
98026	2000 RS_{4}	—	September 1, 2000	Socorro	LINEAR	·	2.1 km	MPC · JPL
98027	2000 RC_{5}	—	September 1, 2000	Socorro	LINEAR	(2076)	1.3 km	MPC · JPL
98028	2000 RJ_{5}	—	September 1, 2000	Socorro	LINEAR	·	1.9 km	MPC · JPL
98029	2000 RE_{7}	—	September 1, 2000	Socorro	LINEAR	V	1.3 km	MPC · JPL
98030	2000 RN_{7}	—	September 1, 2000	Socorro	LINEAR	·	4.0 km	MPC · JPL
98031	2000 RU_{7}	—	September 1, 2000	Socorro	LINEAR	·	3.2 km	MPC · JPL
98032	2000 RV_{7}	—	September 1, 2000	Socorro	LINEAR	PHO	2.7 km	MPC · JPL
98033	2000 RG_{11}	—	September 1, 2000	Socorro	LINEAR	·	1.8 km	MPC · JPL
98034	2000 RQ_{12}	—	September 2, 2000	Višnjan Observatory	K. Korlević	·	2.3 km	MPC · JPL
98035	2000 RO_{18}	—	September 1, 2000	Socorro	LINEAR	·	1.2 km	MPC · JPL
98036	2000 RG_{19}	—	September 1, 2000	Socorro	LINEAR	EOS	4.3 km	MPC · JPL
98037	2000 RE_{20}	—	September 1, 2000	Socorro	LINEAR	L5	13 km	MPC · JPL
98038	2000 RZ_{20}	—	September 1, 2000	Socorro	LINEAR	·	2.4 km	MPC · JPL
98039	2000 RC_{22}	—	September 1, 2000	Socorro	LINEAR	·	2.8 km	MPC · JPL
98040	2000 RC_{23}	—	September 1, 2000	Socorro	LINEAR	·	3.3 km	MPC · JPL
98041	2000 RE_{23}	—	September 1, 2000	Socorro	LINEAR	·	2.3 km	MPC · JPL
98042	2000 RA_{24}	—	September 1, 2000	Socorro	LINEAR	·	3.1 km	MPC · JPL
98043	2000 RQ_{24}	—	September 1, 2000	Socorro	LINEAR	·	2.6 km	MPC · JPL
98044	2000 RU_{25}	—	September 1, 2000	Socorro	LINEAR	·	2.7 km	MPC · JPL
98045	2000 RQ_{27}	—	September 1, 2000	Socorro	LINEAR	·	1.5 km	MPC · JPL
98046	2000 RD_{29}	—	September 1, 2000	Socorro	LINEAR	V	2.7 km	MPC · JPL
98047	2000 RC_{32}	—	September 1, 2000	Socorro	LINEAR	·	2.4 km	MPC · JPL
98048	2000 RR_{32}	—	September 1, 2000	Socorro	LINEAR	V	1.6 km	MPC · JPL
98049	2000 RS_{32}	—	September 1, 2000	Socorro	LINEAR	V	1.6 km	MPC · JPL
98050	2000 RZ_{33}	—	September 1, 2000	Socorro	LINEAR	·	2.5 km	MPC · JPL
98051	2000 RC_{34}	—	September 1, 2000	Socorro	LINEAR	V	1.3 km	MPC · JPL
98052	2000 RX_{34}	—	September 1, 2000	Socorro	LINEAR	V	1.3 km	MPC · JPL
98053	2000 RP_{35}	—	September 2, 2000	Socorro	LINEAR	·	1.7 km	MPC · JPL
98054	2000 RS_{35}	—	September 2, 2000	Socorro	LINEAR	·	1.7 km	MPC · JPL
98055	2000 RR_{38}	—	September 2, 2000	Socorro	LINEAR	slow	3.1 km	MPC · JPL
98056	2000 RR_{41}	—	September 3, 2000	Socorro	LINEAR	·	4.2 km	MPC · JPL
98057	2000 RH_{44}	—	September 3, 2000	Socorro	LINEAR	V	1.8 km	MPC · JPL
98058	2000 RH_{46}	—	September 3, 2000	Socorro	LINEAR	·	2.4 km	MPC · JPL
98059	2000 RC_{47}	—	September 3, 2000	Socorro	LINEAR	·	1.6 km	MPC · JPL
98060	2000 RF_{47}	—	September 3, 2000	Socorro	LINEAR	·	3.2 km	MPC · JPL
98061	2000 RH_{47}	—	September 3, 2000	Socorro	LINEAR	·	4.4 km	MPC · JPL
98062	2000 RW_{47}	—	September 3, 2000	Socorro	LINEAR	·	1.4 km	MPC · JPL
98063	2000 RG_{48}	—	September 3, 2000	Socorro	LINEAR	slow?	2.1 km	MPC · JPL
98064	2000 RY_{48}	—	September 3, 2000	Socorro	LINEAR	·	2.3 km	MPC · JPL
98065	2000 RF_{51}	—	September 5, 2000	Socorro	LINEAR	·	1.9 km	MPC · JPL
98066	2000 RH_{51}	—	September 5, 2000	Socorro	LINEAR	·	4.0 km	MPC · JPL
98067	2000 RQ_{52}	—	September 1, 2000	Socorro	LINEAR	·	2.9 km	MPC · JPL
98068	2000 RV_{52}	—	September 4, 2000	Socorro	LINEAR	NYS	2.7 km	MPC · JPL
98069	2000 RX_{52}	—	September 4, 2000	Socorro	LINEAR	·	2.1 km	MPC · JPL
98070	2000 RQ_{53}	—	September 5, 2000	Prescott	P. G. Comba	NYS	2.1 km	MPC · JPL
98071	2000 RW_{54}	—	September 3, 2000	Socorro	LINEAR	·	3.5 km	MPC · JPL
98072	2000 RC_{56}	—	September 5, 2000	Socorro	LINEAR	V	1.5 km	MPC · JPL
98073	2000 RM_{56}	—	September 6, 2000	Socorro	LINEAR	·	3.4 km	MPC · JPL
98074	2000 RT_{56}	—	September 7, 2000	Kleť	Kleť	V	1.5 km	MPC · JPL
98075	2000 RT_{62}	—	September 2, 2000	Socorro	LINEAR	·	2.5 km	MPC · JPL
98076	2000 RY_{63}	—	September 3, 2000	Socorro	LINEAR	·	3.3 km	MPC · JPL
98077	2000 RO_{64}	—	September 1, 2000	Socorro	LINEAR	V	1.5 km	MPC · JPL
98078	2000 RZ_{65}	—	September 1, 2000	Socorro	LINEAR	·	2.6 km	MPC · JPL
98079	2000 RY_{66}	—	September 1, 2000	Socorro	LINEAR	NYS	2.6 km	MPC · JPL
98080	2000 RB_{67}	—	September 1, 2000	Socorro	LINEAR	·	2.4 km	MPC · JPL
98081	2000 RF_{67}	—	September 1, 2000	Socorro	LINEAR	slow	2.9 km	MPC · JPL
98082	2000 RJ_{67}	—	September 1, 2000	Socorro	LINEAR	·	2.9 km	MPC · JPL
98083	2000 RG_{68}	—	September 2, 2000	Socorro	LINEAR	·	2.1 km	MPC · JPL
98084	2000 RC_{69}	—	September 2, 2000	Socorro	LINEAR	MAS	1.5 km	MPC · JPL
98085	2000 RR_{70}	—	September 2, 2000	Socorro	LINEAR	·	2.1 km	MPC · JPL
98086	2000 RW_{70}	—	September 2, 2000	Socorro	LINEAR	·	2.2 km	MPC · JPL
98087	2000 RH_{71}	—	September 2, 2000	Socorro	LINEAR	·	4.5 km	MPC · JPL
98088	2000 RS_{71}	—	September 2, 2000	Socorro	LINEAR	·	2.0 km	MPC · JPL
98089	2000 RO_{72}	—	September 2, 2000	Socorro	LINEAR	·	2.0 km	MPC · JPL
98090	2000 RE_{73}	—	September 2, 2000	Socorro	LINEAR	·	1.5 km	MPC · JPL
98091	2000 RK_{73}	—	September 2, 2000	Socorro	LINEAR	·	1.5 km	MPC · JPL
98092	2000 RT_{73}	—	September 2, 2000	Socorro	LINEAR	·	1.9 km	MPC · JPL
98093	2000 RW_{73}	—	September 2, 2000	Socorro	LINEAR	NYS	2.6 km	MPC · JPL
98094	2000 RG_{77}	—	September 7, 2000	Elmira	Cecce, A. J.	·	3.0 km	MPC · JPL
98095	2000 RQ_{77}	—	September 8, 2000	Ondřejov	L. Kotková	NYS	2.5 km	MPC · JPL
98096	2000 RR_{77}	—	September 8, 2000	Ondřejov	L. Kotková	·	1.5 km	MPC · JPL
98097	2000 RA_{78}	—	September 2, 2000	Anderson Mesa	LONEOS	·	2.6 km	MPC · JPL
98098	2000 RY_{82}	—	September 1, 2000	Socorro	LINEAR	·	3.0 km	MPC · JPL
98099	2000 RF_{83}	—	September 1, 2000	Socorro	LINEAR	PHO	3.1 km	MPC · JPL
98100	2000 RN_{83}	—	September 1, 2000	Socorro	LINEAR	·	1.8 km	MPC · JPL

== 98101–98200 ==
back to top

Designation			Discovery			Properties		Ref
Permanent	Provisional	Named after	Date	Site	Discoverer(s)	Category	Diam.	Ref
98101	2000 RM_{84}	—	September 2, 2000	Anderson Mesa	LONEOS	V	1.2 km	MPC · JPL
98102	2000 RZ_{84}	—	September 2, 2000	Anderson Mesa	LONEOS	·	3.8 km	MPC · JPL
98103	2000 RX_{86}	—	September 2, 2000	Anderson Mesa	LONEOS	V	1.4 km	MPC · JPL
98104	2000 RK_{87}	—	September 2, 2000	Anderson Mesa	LONEOS	·	1.9 km	MPC · JPL
98105	2000 RK_{90}	—	September 3, 2000	Socorro	LINEAR	·	1.7 km	MPC · JPL
98106	2000 RK_{91}	—	September 3, 2000	Socorro	LINEAR	·	2.5 km	MPC · JPL
98107	2000 RM_{91}	—	September 3, 2000	Socorro	LINEAR	·	3.1 km	MPC · JPL
98108	2000 RP_{91}	—	September 3, 2000	Socorro	LINEAR	·	2.2 km	MPC · JPL
98109	2000 RN_{92}	—	September 3, 2000	Socorro	LINEAR	V	1.4 km	MPC · JPL
98110	2000 RR_{92}	—	September 3, 2000	Socorro	LINEAR	·	1.4 km	MPC · JPL
98111	2000 RX_{93}	—	September 4, 2000	Anderson Mesa	LONEOS	·	1.6 km	MPC · JPL
98112	2000 RG_{94}	—	September 4, 2000	Anderson Mesa	LONEOS	·	2.3 km	MPC · JPL
98113	2000 RN_{94}	—	September 4, 2000	Anderson Mesa	LONEOS	V	2.0 km	MPC · JPL
98114	2000 RQ_{95}	—	September 4, 2000	Anderson Mesa	LONEOS	·	2.1 km	MPC · JPL
98115	2000 RF_{100}	—	September 5, 2000	Anderson Mesa	LONEOS	·	1.7 km	MPC · JPL
98116	2000 RA_{103}	—	September 5, 2000	Anderson Mesa	LONEOS	L5	20 km	MPC · JPL
98117	2000 SP_{2}	—	September 20, 2000	Socorro	LINEAR	·	2.2 km	MPC · JPL
98118	2000 SL_{3}	—	September 20, 2000	Socorro	LINEAR	·	1.5 km	MPC · JPL
98119	2000 SA_{4}	—	September 21, 2000	Socorro	LINEAR	·	1.9 km	MPC · JPL
98120	2000 SK_{5}	—	September 22, 2000	Višnjan Observatory	K. Korlević, M. Jurić	·	1.9 km	MPC · JPL
98121	2000 SB_{6}	—	September 20, 2000	Socorro	LINEAR	PHO	2.4 km	MPC · JPL
98122	2000 SW_{11}	—	September 20, 2000	Socorro	LINEAR	·	2.1 km	MPC · JPL
98123	2000 SG_{15}	—	September 23, 2000	Socorro	LINEAR	·	1.9 km	MPC · JPL
98124	2000 SB_{20}	—	September 23, 2000	Socorro	LINEAR	·	1.7 km	MPC · JPL
98125	2000 SB_{21}	—	September 24, 2000	Bisei SG Center	BATTeRS	·	2.5 km	MPC · JPL
98126	2000 SH_{23}	—	September 26, 2000	Višnjan Observatory	K. Korlević	·	2.6 km	MPC · JPL
98127 Vilgusová	2000 SP_{24}	Vilgusová	September 24, 2000	Ondřejov	L. Kotková, P. Pravec	·	2.3 km	MPC · JPL
98128	2000 SS_{24}	—	September 26, 2000	Bisei SG Center	BATTeRS	V	2.1 km	MPC · JPL
98129	2000 SD_{25}	—	September 22, 2000	Socorro	LINEAR	·	5.2 km	MPC · JPL
98130	2000 SD_{28}	—	September 23, 2000	Socorro	LINEAR	V	1.5 km	MPC · JPL
98131	2000 SX_{30}	—	September 24, 2000	Socorro	LINEAR	NYS	2.3 km	MPC · JPL
98132	2000 SD_{37}	—	September 24, 2000	Socorro	LINEAR	·	1.5 km	MPC · JPL
98133	2000 SL_{38}	—	September 24, 2000	Socorro	LINEAR	·	1.6 km	MPC · JPL
98134	2000 SM_{39}	—	September 24, 2000	Socorro	LINEAR	·	1.8 km	MPC · JPL
98135	2000 SO_{40}	—	September 24, 2000	Socorro	LINEAR	slow	2.8 km	MPC · JPL
98136	2000 SP_{40}	—	September 24, 2000	Socorro	LINEAR	·	1.6 km	MPC · JPL
98137	2000 SO_{41}	—	September 24, 2000	Socorro	LINEAR	·	1.3 km	MPC · JPL
98138	2000 SW_{42}	—	September 25, 2000	Črni Vrh	Mikuž, H.	·	1.7 km	MPC · JPL
98139	2000 SG_{53}	—	September 24, 2000	Socorro	LINEAR	L5 · fast	14 km	MPC · JPL
98140	2000 SK_{54}	—	September 24, 2000	Socorro	LINEAR	NYS	2.0 km	MPC · JPL
98141	2000 SV_{57}	—	September 24, 2000	Socorro	LINEAR	MAS	1.3 km	MPC · JPL
98142	2000 SX_{59}	—	September 24, 2000	Socorro	LINEAR	NYS	2.6 km	MPC · JPL
98143	2000 SS_{60}	—	September 24, 2000	Socorro	LINEAR	L5	18 km	MPC · JPL
98144	2000 SR_{61}	—	September 24, 2000	Socorro	LINEAR	·	2.8 km	MPC · JPL
98145	2000 SK_{64}	—	September 24, 2000	Socorro	LINEAR	·	2.4 km	MPC · JPL
98146	2000 SM_{64}	—	September 24, 2000	Socorro	LINEAR	MAS	2.1 km	MPC · JPL
98147	2000 SR_{64}	—	September 24, 2000	Socorro	LINEAR	·	2.5 km	MPC · JPL
98148	2000 ST_{64}	—	September 24, 2000	Socorro	LINEAR	·	1.6 km	MPC · JPL
98149	2000 SL_{65}	—	September 24, 2000	Socorro	LINEAR	·	3.5 km	MPC · JPL
98150	2000 SO_{66}	—	September 24, 2000	Socorro	LINEAR	fast	1.5 km	MPC · JPL
98151	2000 SU_{66}	—	September 24, 2000	Socorro	LINEAR	NYS	2.4 km	MPC · JPL
98152	2000 SW_{66}	—	September 24, 2000	Socorro	LINEAR	·	1.6 km	MPC · JPL
98153	2000 SY_{68}	—	September 24, 2000	Socorro	LINEAR	L5	20 km	MPC · JPL
98154	2000 SE_{69}	—	September 24, 2000	Socorro	LINEAR	·	2.0 km	MPC · JPL
98155	2000 SF_{70}	—	September 24, 2000	Socorro	LINEAR	V	1.4 km	MPC · JPL
98156	2000 SO_{71}	—	September 24, 2000	Socorro	LINEAR	·	2.7 km	MPC · JPL
98157	2000 SF_{73}	—	September 24, 2000	Socorro	LINEAR	·	2.7 km	MPC · JPL
98158	2000 ST_{75}	—	September 24, 2000	Socorro	LINEAR	·	2.3 km	MPC · JPL
98159	2000 SN_{76}	—	September 24, 2000	Socorro	LINEAR	·	2.2 km	MPC · JPL
98160	2000 SP_{77}	—	September 24, 2000	Socorro	LINEAR	·	2.1 km	MPC · JPL
98161	2000 SG_{78}	—	September 24, 2000	Socorro	LINEAR	NYS	2.5 km	MPC · JPL
98162	2000 SP_{78}	—	September 24, 2000	Socorro	LINEAR	·	2.4 km	MPC · JPL
98163	2000 SX_{82}	—	September 24, 2000	Socorro	LINEAR	·	2.6 km	MPC · JPL
98164	2000 SR_{84}	—	September 24, 2000	Socorro	LINEAR	·	2.4 km	MPC · JPL
98165	2000 SP_{85}	—	September 24, 2000	Socorro	LINEAR	·	1.9 km	MPC · JPL
98166	2000 ST_{85}	—	September 24, 2000	Socorro	LINEAR	·	1.8 km	MPC · JPL
98167	2000 SF_{86}	—	September 24, 2000	Socorro	LINEAR	·	3.1 km	MPC · JPL
98168	2000 SV_{86}	—	September 24, 2000	Socorro	LINEAR	BAP	3.0 km	MPC · JPL
98169	2000 SB_{87}	—	September 24, 2000	Socorro	LINEAR	·	1.8 km	MPC · JPL
98170	2000 SJ_{87}	—	September 24, 2000	Socorro	LINEAR	ERI	2.9 km	MPC · JPL
98171	2000 SD_{88}	—	September 24, 2000	Socorro	LINEAR	·	7.9 km	MPC · JPL
98172	2000 SN_{92}	—	September 23, 2000	Socorro	LINEAR	·	3.9 km	MPC · JPL
98173	2000 SO_{92}	—	September 23, 2000	Socorro	LINEAR	·	2.1 km	MPC · JPL
98174	2000 SM_{93}	—	September 23, 2000	Socorro	LINEAR	·	3.1 km	MPC · JPL
98175	2000 SU_{94}	—	September 23, 2000	Socorro	LINEAR	V	1.3 km	MPC · JPL
98176	2000 SU_{95}	—	September 23, 2000	Socorro	LINEAR	·	1.4 km	MPC · JPL
98177	2000 SX_{97}	—	September 23, 2000	Socorro	LINEAR	·	2.4 km	MPC · JPL
98178	2000 SU_{99}	—	September 23, 2000	Socorro	LINEAR	CLA	4.3 km	MPC · JPL
98179	2000 SA_{100}	—	September 23, 2000	Socorro	LINEAR	NYS	3.5 km	MPC · JPL
98180	2000 SJ_{102}	—	September 24, 2000	Socorro	LINEAR	NYS	2.0 km	MPC · JPL
98181	2000 SC_{103}	—	September 24, 2000	Socorro	LINEAR	V	1.8 km	MPC · JPL
98182	2000 SR_{105}	—	September 24, 2000	Socorro	LINEAR	·	1.3 km	MPC · JPL
98183	2000 SH_{106}	—	September 24, 2000	Socorro	LINEAR	·	3.8 km	MPC · JPL
98184	2000 SY_{106}	—	September 24, 2000	Socorro	LINEAR	·	2.9 km	MPC · JPL
98185	2000 SN_{108}	—	September 24, 2000	Socorro	LINEAR	·	1.3 km	MPC · JPL
98186	2000 SE_{109}	—	September 24, 2000	Socorro	LINEAR	·	4.1 km	MPC · JPL
98187	2000 SO_{109}	—	September 24, 2000	Socorro	LINEAR	·	1.4 km	MPC · JPL
98188	2000 SA_{110}	—	September 24, 2000	Socorro	LINEAR	MAS	1.3 km	MPC · JPL
98189	2000 SN_{110}	—	September 24, 2000	Socorro	LINEAR	MAS	1.6 km	MPC · JPL
98190	2000 SL_{112}	—	September 24, 2000	Socorro	LINEAR	V	1.2 km	MPC · JPL
98191	2000 SN_{113}	—	September 24, 2000	Socorro	LINEAR	NYS	2.4 km	MPC · JPL
98192	2000 SM_{114}	—	September 24, 2000	Socorro	LINEAR	·	2.6 km	MPC · JPL
98193	2000 SG_{115}	—	September 24, 2000	Socorro	LINEAR	·	3.3 km	MPC · JPL
98194	2000 SG_{116}	—	September 24, 2000	Socorro	LINEAR	·	1.2 km	MPC · JPL
98195	2000 SX_{116}	—	September 24, 2000	Socorro	LINEAR	·	1.6 km	MPC · JPL
98196	2000 SZ_{116}	—	September 24, 2000	Socorro	LINEAR	NYS	2.3 km	MPC · JPL
98197	2000 SQ_{117}	—	September 24, 2000	Socorro	LINEAR	·	2.1 km	MPC · JPL
98198	2000 SJ_{118}	—	September 24, 2000	Socorro	LINEAR	·	2.1 km	MPC · JPL
98199	2000 SQ_{119}	—	September 24, 2000	Socorro	LINEAR	·	2.1 km	MPC · JPL
98200	2000 SN_{121}	—	September 24, 2000	Socorro	LINEAR	·	3.8 km	MPC · JPL

== 98201–98300 ==
back to top

Designation			Discovery			Properties		Ref
Permanent	Provisional	Named after	Date	Site	Discoverer(s)	Category	Diam.	Ref
98201	2000 SJ_{122}	—	September 24, 2000	Socorro	LINEAR	(2076)	2.9 km	MPC · JPL
98202	2000 SF_{123}	—	September 24, 2000	Socorro	LINEAR	·	2.3 km	MPC · JPL
98203	2000 SM_{123}	—	September 24, 2000	Socorro	LINEAR	·	2.6 km	MPC · JPL
98204	2000 SY_{124}	—	September 24, 2000	Socorro	LINEAR	·	2.9 km	MPC · JPL
98205	2000 SG_{125}	—	September 24, 2000	Socorro	LINEAR	slow	2.5 km	MPC · JPL
98206	2000 SE_{126}	—	September 24, 2000	Socorro	LINEAR	·	2.7 km	MPC · JPL
98207	2000 SQ_{126}	—	September 24, 2000	Socorro	LINEAR	NYS	2.9 km	MPC · JPL
98208	2000 SZ_{126}	—	September 24, 2000	Socorro	LINEAR	MAS	2.7 km	MPC · JPL
98209	2000 SK_{130}	—	September 22, 2000	Socorro	LINEAR	·	4.3 km	MPC · JPL
98210	2000 SF_{133}	—	September 23, 2000	Socorro	LINEAR	·	2.9 km	MPC · JPL
98211	2000 SX_{137}	—	September 23, 2000	Socorro	LINEAR	·	2.8 km	MPC · JPL
98212	2000 SC_{138}	—	September 23, 2000	Socorro	LINEAR	(2076)	3.0 km	MPC · JPL
98213	2000 SV_{138}	—	September 23, 2000	Socorro	LINEAR	·	1.6 km	MPC · JPL
98214	2000 SD_{140}	—	September 23, 2000	Socorro	LINEAR	·	2.5 km	MPC · JPL
98215	2000 SM_{140}	—	September 23, 2000	Socorro	LINEAR	·	1.5 km	MPC · JPL
98216	2000 SQ_{140}	—	September 23, 2000	Socorro	LINEAR	·	2.3 km	MPC · JPL
98217	2000 SV_{141}	—	September 23, 2000	Socorro	LINEAR	·	1.8 km	MPC · JPL
98218	2000 SG_{142}	—	September 23, 2000	Socorro	LINEAR	·	2.4 km	MPC · JPL
98219	2000 SK_{142}	—	September 23, 2000	Socorro	LINEAR	V	1.6 km	MPC · JPL
98220	2000 SC_{143}	—	September 23, 2000	Socorro	LINEAR	·	1.6 km	MPC · JPL
98221	2000 SL_{143}	—	September 23, 2000	Socorro	LINEAR	·	6.2 km	MPC · JPL
98222	2000 SL_{144}	—	September 24, 2000	Socorro	LINEAR	·	2.0 km	MPC · JPL
98223	2000 SQ_{144}	—	September 24, 2000	Socorro	LINEAR	NYS	3.0 km	MPC · JPL
98224	2000 ST_{144}	—	September 24, 2000	Socorro	LINEAR	·	1.3 km	MPC · JPL
98225	2000 SU_{146}	—	September 24, 2000	Socorro	LINEAR	·	2.1 km	MPC · JPL
98226	2000 SW_{146}	—	September 24, 2000	Socorro	LINEAR	·	2.1 km	MPC · JPL
98227	2000 SO_{147}	—	September 24, 2000	Socorro	LINEAR	·	2.4 km	MPC · JPL
98228	2000 SV_{147}	—	September 24, 2000	Socorro	LINEAR	·	1.3 km	MPC · JPL
98229	2000 SE_{150}	—	September 24, 2000	Socorro	LINEAR	MAS	1.5 km	MPC · JPL
98230	2000 SS_{150}	—	September 24, 2000	Socorro	LINEAR	NYS	2.2 km	MPC · JPL
98231	2000 SG_{151}	—	September 24, 2000	Socorro	LINEAR	·	2.2 km	MPC · JPL
98232	2000 SJ_{151}	—	September 24, 2000	Socorro	LINEAR	·	2.9 km	MPC · JPL
98233	2000 SN_{151}	—	September 24, 2000	Socorro	LINEAR	·	2.7 km	MPC · JPL
98234	2000 SA_{152}	—	September 24, 2000	Socorro	LINEAR	·	1.9 km	MPC · JPL
98235	2000 SE_{153}	—	September 24, 2000	Socorro	LINEAR	·	3.0 km	MPC · JPL
98236	2000 SK_{153}	—	September 24, 2000	Socorro	LINEAR	·	1.2 km	MPC · JPL
98237	2000 SQ_{153}	—	September 24, 2000	Socorro	LINEAR	·	2.7 km	MPC · JPL
98238	2000 SS_{154}	—	September 24, 2000	Socorro	LINEAR	·	3.5 km	MPC · JPL
98239	2000 SH_{156}	—	September 24, 2000	Socorro	LINEAR	·	2.4 km	MPC · JPL
98240	2000 SK_{158}	—	September 27, 2000	Socorro	LINEAR	·	4.0 km	MPC · JPL
98241	2000 SL_{158}	—	September 27, 2000	Socorro	LINEAR	·	1.5 km	MPC · JPL
98242	2000 SS_{162}	—	September 30, 2000	Elmira	Cecce, A. J.	·	1.8 km	MPC · JPL
98243	2000 SE_{166}	—	September 23, 2000	Socorro	LINEAR	·	2.5 km	MPC · JPL
98244	2000 SH_{166}	—	September 23, 2000	Socorro	LINEAR	V	1.3 km	MPC · JPL
98245	2000 SO_{166}	—	September 23, 2000	Socorro	LINEAR	·	1.9 km	MPC · JPL
98246	2000 SY_{166}	—	September 23, 2000	Socorro	LINEAR	PHO	4.3 km	MPC · JPL
98247	2000 SJ_{167}	—	September 23, 2000	Socorro	LINEAR	·	2.7 km	MPC · JPL
98248	2000 SP_{167}	—	September 23, 2000	Socorro	LINEAR	·	2.8 km	MPC · JPL
98249	2000 SH_{169}	—	September 23, 2000	Socorro	LINEAR	BAP	2.2 km	MPC · JPL
98250	2000 SO_{169}	—	September 24, 2000	Socorro	LINEAR	NYS	2.5 km	MPC · JPL
98251	2000 SQ_{169}	—	September 24, 2000	Socorro	LINEAR	·	1.6 km	MPC · JPL
98252	2000 SY_{170}	—	September 24, 2000	Socorro	LINEAR	·	3.9 km	MPC · JPL
98253	2000 SH_{174}	—	September 28, 2000	Socorro	LINEAR	·	4.2 km	MPC · JPL
98254	2000 SU_{178}	—	September 28, 2000	Socorro	LINEAR	·	2.3 km	MPC · JPL
98255	2000 SX_{180}	—	September 19, 2000	Kitt Peak	Spacewatch	·	2.3 km	MPC · JPL
98256	2000 SD_{181}	—	September 19, 2000	Haleakala	NEAT	·	4.8 km	MPC · JPL
98257	2000 SJ_{181}	—	September 19, 2000	Haleakala	NEAT	·	2.0 km	MPC · JPL
98258	2000 SG_{182}	—	September 20, 2000	Socorro	LINEAR	·	1.8 km	MPC · JPL
98259	2000 SH_{182}	—	September 20, 2000	Socorro	LINEAR	·	2.6 km	MPC · JPL
98260	2000 SL_{182}	—	September 20, 2000	Socorro	LINEAR	·	2.8 km	MPC · JPL
98261	2000 SA_{185}	—	September 20, 2000	Haleakala	NEAT	·	2.7 km	MPC · JPL
98262	2000 SF_{185}	—	September 20, 2000	Haleakala	NEAT	·	4.7 km	MPC · JPL
98263	2000 SR_{185}	—	September 21, 2000	Socorro	LINEAR	·	2.5 km	MPC · JPL
98264	2000 SO_{187}	—	September 21, 2000	Haleakala	NEAT	·	1.9 km	MPC · JPL
98265	2000 SX_{187}	—	September 21, 2000	Haleakala	NEAT	·	2.4 km	MPC · JPL
98266	2000 SU_{189}	—	September 22, 2000	Haleakala	NEAT	·	1.4 km	MPC · JPL
98267	2000 SN_{193}	—	September 24, 2000	Socorro	LINEAR	·	2.0 km	MPC · JPL
98268	2000 SR_{196}	—	September 24, 2000	Socorro	LINEAR	·	2.9 km	MPC · JPL
98269	2000 SL_{200}	—	September 24, 2000	Socorro	LINEAR	(2076)	1.4 km	MPC · JPL
98270	2000 SW_{203}	—	September 24, 2000	Socorro	LINEAR	·	2.5 km	MPC · JPL
98271	2000 SY_{203}	—	September 24, 2000	Socorro	LINEAR	·	1.7 km	MPC · JPL
98272	2000 SN_{205}	—	September 24, 2000	Socorro	LINEAR	·	2.3 km	MPC · JPL
98273	2000 SG_{207}	—	September 24, 2000	Socorro	LINEAR	·	1.5 km	MPC · JPL
98274	2000 SU_{207}	—	September 24, 2000	Socorro	LINEAR	NYS	2.4 km	MPC · JPL
98275	2000 SB_{211}	—	September 25, 2000	Socorro	LINEAR	·	1.8 km	MPC · JPL
98276	2000 SF_{211}	—	September 25, 2000	Socorro	LINEAR	·	2.8 km	MPC · JPL
98277	2000 SM_{211}	—	September 25, 2000	Socorro	LINEAR	V	1.8 km	MPC · JPL
98278	2000 SE_{212}	—	September 25, 2000	Socorro	LINEAR	·	1.7 km	MPC · JPL
98279	2000 SK_{212}	—	September 25, 2000	Socorro	LINEAR	V	1.9 km	MPC · JPL
98280	2000 SU_{213}	—	September 25, 2000	Socorro	LINEAR	·	2.9 km	MPC · JPL
98281	2000 SZ_{216}	—	September 26, 2000	Socorro	LINEAR	·	2.9 km	MPC · JPL
98282	2000 SY_{217}	—	September 26, 2000	Socorro	LINEAR	·	3.5 km	MPC · JPL
98283	2000 SB_{218}	—	September 26, 2000	Socorro	LINEAR	·	1.7 km	MPC · JPL
98284	2000 SG_{218}	—	September 26, 2000	Socorro	LINEAR	V	1.9 km	MPC · JPL
98285	2000 SV_{220}	—	September 26, 2000	Socorro	LINEAR	·	3.2 km	MPC · JPL
98286	2000 SR_{221}	—	September 26, 2000	Socorro	LINEAR	·	1.9 km	MPC · JPL
98287	2000 SM_{222}	—	September 26, 2000	Socorro	LINEAR	PHO	1.8 km	MPC · JPL
98288	2000 SY_{222}	—	September 27, 2000	Socorro	LINEAR	NYS	2.2 km	MPC · JPL
98289	2000 SP_{226}	—	September 27, 2000	Socorro	LINEAR	PHO	3.3 km	MPC · JPL
98290	2000 SE_{228}	—	September 28, 2000	Socorro	LINEAR	·	2.8 km	MPC · JPL
98291	2000 SS_{229}	—	September 28, 2000	Socorro	LINEAR	·	2.8 km	MPC · JPL
98292	2000 SC_{230}	—	September 28, 2000	Socorro	LINEAR	·	2.3 km	MPC · JPL
98293	2000 SD_{230}	—	September 28, 2000	Socorro	LINEAR	·	1.3 km	MPC · JPL
98294	2000 SO_{230}	—	September 28, 2000	Socorro	LINEAR	NYS	2.3 km	MPC · JPL
98295	2000 SE_{231}	—	September 30, 2000	Socorro	LINEAR	V	1.7 km	MPC · JPL
98296	2000 SC_{233}	—	September 28, 2000	Socorro	LINEAR	PHO	2.2 km	MPC · JPL
98297	2000 SO_{233}	—	September 21, 2000	Socorro	LINEAR	V	1.7 km	MPC · JPL
98298	2000 SO_{234}	—	September 22, 2000	Socorro	LINEAR	·	1.9 km	MPC · JPL
98299	2000 SD_{235}	—	September 24, 2000	Socorro	LINEAR	·	1.2 km	MPC · JPL
98300	2000 SE_{235}	—	September 24, 2000	Socorro	LINEAR	·	2.1 km	MPC · JPL

== 98301–98400 ==
back to top

Designation			Discovery			Properties		Ref
Permanent	Provisional	Named after	Date	Site	Discoverer(s)	Category	Diam.	Ref
98301	2000 SS_{237}	—	September 25, 2000	Socorro	LINEAR	(2076)	3.3 km	MPC · JPL
98302	2000 SX_{237}	—	September 25, 2000	Socorro	LINEAR	·	2.9 km	MPC · JPL
98303	2000 SZ_{237}	—	September 25, 2000	Socorro	LINEAR	·	3.0 km	MPC · JPL
98304	2000 SJ_{241}	—	September 23, 2000	Socorro	LINEAR	·	1.6 km	MPC · JPL
98305	2000 SG_{243}	—	September 24, 2000	Socorro	LINEAR	·	1.8 km	MPC · JPL
98306	2000 SP_{243}	—	September 24, 2000	Socorro	LINEAR	·	1.9 km	MPC · JPL
98307	2000 SO_{251}	—	September 24, 2000	Socorro	LINEAR	NYS	2.9 km	MPC · JPL
98308	2000 SY_{251}	—	September 24, 2000	Socorro	LINEAR	·	2.1 km	MPC · JPL
98309	2000 SF_{254}	—	September 24, 2000	Socorro	LINEAR	·	1.7 km	MPC · JPL
98310	2000 ST_{256}	—	September 24, 2000	Socorro	LINEAR	·	1.4 km	MPC · JPL
98311	2000 SO_{257}	—	September 24, 2000	Socorro	LINEAR	·	1.4 km	MPC · JPL
98312	2000 SK_{258}	—	September 24, 2000	Socorro	LINEAR	NYS	3.0 km	MPC · JPL
98313	2000 SP_{258}	—	September 24, 2000	Socorro	LINEAR	ERI	3.5 km	MPC · JPL
98314	2000 SA_{259}	—	September 24, 2000	Socorro	LINEAR	·	2.3 km	MPC · JPL
98315	2000 SG_{261}	—	September 24, 2000	Socorro	LINEAR	(2076)	2.3 km	MPC · JPL
98316	2000 SQ_{261}	—	September 24, 2000	Socorro	LINEAR	·	2.4 km	MPC · JPL
98317	2000 SR_{262}	—	September 25, 2000	Socorro	LINEAR	(2076)	2.6 km	MPC · JPL
98318	2000 SR_{263}	—	September 26, 2000	Socorro	LINEAR	NYS	2.6 km	MPC · JPL
98319	2000 SQ_{265}	—	September 26, 2000	Socorro	LINEAR	·	3.3 km	MPC · JPL
98320	2000 SA_{269}	—	September 27, 2000	Socorro	LINEAR	·	3.3 km	MPC · JPL
98321	2000 SS_{269}	—	September 27, 2000	Socorro	LINEAR	V	2.1 km	MPC · JPL
98322	2000 SY_{269}	—	September 27, 2000	Socorro	LINEAR	·	1.3 km	MPC · JPL
98323	2000 SB_{270}	—	September 27, 2000	Socorro	LINEAR	·	2.3 km	MPC · JPL
98324	2000 SK_{271}	—	September 27, 2000	Socorro	LINEAR	·	1.5 km	MPC · JPL
98325	2000 SR_{273}	—	September 28, 2000	Socorro	LINEAR	·	2.4 km	MPC · JPL
98326	2000 SG_{274}	—	September 28, 2000	Socorro	LINEAR	·	2.2 km	MPC · JPL
98327	2000 SN_{274}	—	September 28, 2000	Socorro	LINEAR	·	1.5 km	MPC · JPL
98328	2000 SU_{276}	—	September 30, 2000	Socorro	LINEAR	·	1.6 km	MPC · JPL
98329	2000 SB_{278}	—	September 30, 2000	Socorro	LINEAR	NYS	2.5 km	MPC · JPL
98330	2000 SE_{286}	—	September 24, 2000	Socorro	LINEAR	·	1.6 km	MPC · JPL
98331	2000 SL_{290}	—	September 27, 2000	Socorro	LINEAR	·	2.2 km	MPC · JPL
98332	2000 SF_{294}	—	September 27, 2000	Socorro	LINEAR	PHO	3.2 km	MPC · JPL
98333	2000 SC_{295}	—	September 27, 2000	Socorro	LINEAR	·	2.3 km	MPC · JPL
98334	2000 SK_{295}	—	September 27, 2000	Socorro	LINEAR	·	2.5 km	MPC · JPL
98335	2000 SP_{295}	—	September 27, 2000	Socorro	LINEAR	·	2.9 km	MPC · JPL
98336	2000 SS_{295}	—	September 27, 2000	Socorro	LINEAR	V	1.8 km	MPC · JPL
98337	2000 SX_{295}	—	September 27, 2000	Socorro	LINEAR	·	3.4 km	MPC · JPL
98338	2000 SB_{296}	—	September 27, 2000	Socorro	LINEAR	·	2.9 km	MPC · JPL
98339	2000 SG_{296}	—	September 27, 2000	Socorro	LINEAR	PHO	2.6 km	MPC · JPL
98340	2000 SU_{296}	—	September 28, 2000	Socorro	LINEAR	·	2.2 km	MPC · JPL
98341	2000 SF_{298}	—	September 28, 2000	Socorro	LINEAR	V	1.5 km	MPC · JPL
98342	2000 SD_{299}	—	September 28, 2000	Socorro	LINEAR	slow?	1.5 km	MPC · JPL
98343	2000 SR_{301}	—	September 28, 2000	Socorro	LINEAR	·	1.4 km	MPC · JPL
98344	2000 SH_{302}	—	September 28, 2000	Socorro	LINEAR	·	1.7 km	MPC · JPL
98345	2000 SQ_{304}	—	September 30, 2000	Socorro	LINEAR	·	4.6 km	MPC · JPL
98346	2000 SW_{304}	—	September 30, 2000	Socorro	LINEAR	·	1.7 km	MPC · JPL
98347	2000 SV_{306}	—	September 30, 2000	Socorro	LINEAR	·	1.8 km	MPC · JPL
98348	2000 SM_{307}	—	September 30, 2000	Socorro	LINEAR	·	2.2 km	MPC · JPL
98349	2000 ST_{309}	—	September 24, 2000	Socorro	LINEAR	·	2.7 km	MPC · JPL
98350	2000 SL_{318}	—	September 29, 2000	Haleakala	NEAT	·	2.6 km	MPC · JPL
98351	2000 SG_{323}	—	September 28, 2000	Kitt Peak	Spacewatch	NYS	2.9 km	MPC · JPL
98352	2000 SX_{327}	—	September 30, 2000	Socorro	LINEAR	·	2.6 km	MPC · JPL
98353	2000 SU_{328}	—	September 27, 2000	Kitt Peak	Spacewatch	·	1.2 km	MPC · JPL
98354	2000 SM_{330}	—	September 27, 2000	Kitt Peak	Spacewatch	·	1.7 km	MPC · JPL
98355	2000 SZ_{335}	—	September 26, 2000	Haleakala	NEAT	·	2.1 km	MPC · JPL
98356	2000 SG_{336}	—	September 26, 2000	Haleakala	NEAT	·	2.4 km	MPC · JPL
98357	2000 SS_{336}	—	September 26, 2000	Haleakala	NEAT	·	2.1 km	MPC · JPL
98358	2000 SA_{337}	—	September 26, 2000	Haleakala	NEAT	V	1.9 km	MPC · JPL
98359	2000 SN_{349}	—	September 30, 2000	Anderson Mesa	LONEOS	·	3.8 km	MPC · JPL
98360	2000 SV_{354}	—	September 29, 2000	Anderson Mesa	LONEOS	·	2.2 km	MPC · JPL
98361	2000 SG_{361}	—	September 23, 2000	Anderson Mesa	LONEOS	L5	19 km	MPC · JPL
98362	2000 SA_{363}	—	September 21, 2000	Anderson Mesa	LONEOS	L5	14 km	MPC · JPL
98363	2000 SL_{363}	—	September 21, 2000	Anderson Mesa	LONEOS	·	2.0 km	MPC · JPL
98364	2000 SE_{364}	—	September 20, 2000	Socorro	LINEAR	V	1.5 km	MPC · JPL
98365	2000 SK_{367}	—	September 22, 2000	Haleakala	NEAT	·	2.5 km	MPC · JPL
98366	2000 TJ_{11}	—	October 1, 2000	Socorro	LINEAR	NYS	1.7 km	MPC · JPL
98367	2000 TP_{16}	—	October 1, 2000	Socorro	LINEAR	MAS	1.6 km	MPC · JPL
98368	2000 TU_{17}	—	October 1, 2000	Socorro	LINEAR	·	1.2 km	MPC · JPL
98369	2000 TA_{18}	—	October 1, 2000	Socorro	LINEAR	·	2.7 km	MPC · JPL
98370	2000 TW_{18}	—	October 1, 2000	Socorro	LINEAR	·	1.3 km	MPC · JPL
98371	2000 TL_{19}	—	October 1, 2000	Socorro	LINEAR	V · slow	1.4 km	MPC · JPL
98372	2000 TO_{19}	—	October 1, 2000	Socorro	LINEAR	V	1.3 km	MPC · JPL
98373	2000 TC_{20}	—	October 1, 2000	Socorro	LINEAR	·	2.1 km	MPC · JPL
98374	2000 TD_{23}	—	October 1, 2000	Socorro	LINEAR	·	1.2 km	MPC · JPL
98375	2000 TU_{25}	—	October 1, 2000	Socorro	LINEAR	·	1.7 km	MPC · JPL
98376	2000 TN_{26}	—	October 2, 2000	Socorro	LINEAR	ERI	4.3 km	MPC · JPL
98377	2000 TV_{26}	—	October 2, 2000	Socorro	LINEAR	·	3.5 km	MPC · JPL
98378	2000 TY_{27}	—	October 3, 2000	Socorro	LINEAR	·	2.5 km	MPC · JPL
98379	2000 TN_{33}	—	October 4, 2000	Socorro	LINEAR	PHO	3.4 km	MPC · JPL
98380	2000 TR_{35}	—	October 6, 2000	Anderson Mesa	LONEOS	·	1.4 km	MPC · JPL
98381	2000 TP_{37}	—	October 1, 2000	Socorro	LINEAR	·	2.1 km	MPC · JPL
98382	2000 TP_{38}	—	October 1, 2000	Socorro	LINEAR	·	1.9 km	MPC · JPL
98383	2000 TL_{39}	—	October 1, 2000	Socorro	LINEAR	·	2.4 km	MPC · JPL
98384	2000 TG_{42}	—	October 1, 2000	Socorro	LINEAR	V	1.3 km	MPC · JPL
98385	2000 TN_{52}	—	October 1, 2000	Socorro	LINEAR	·	4.3 km	MPC · JPL
98386	2000 TR_{55}	—	October 1, 2000	Socorro	LINEAR	·	5.9 km	MPC · JPL
98387	2000 TU_{55}	—	October 1, 2000	Socorro	LINEAR	·	2.6 km	MPC · JPL
98388	2000 TM_{58}	—	October 2, 2000	Socorro	LINEAR	·	3.9 km	MPC · JPL
98389	2000 TP_{58}	—	October 2, 2000	Socorro	LINEAR	NYS	2.2 km	MPC · JPL
98390	2000 TC_{62}	—	October 2, 2000	Anderson Mesa	LONEOS	·	2.2 km	MPC · JPL
98391	2000 TL_{62}	—	October 2, 2000	Socorro	LINEAR	·	4.5 km	MPC · JPL
98392	2000 UC	—	October 18, 2000	Bisei SG Center	BATTeRS	·	2.3 km	MPC · JPL
98393	2000 UG_{2}	—	October 23, 2000	Višnjan Observatory	K. Korlević	·	6.2 km	MPC · JPL
98394	2000 UH_{2}	—	October 23, 2000	Višnjan Observatory	K. Korlević	·	2.8 km	MPC · JPL
98395	2000 UQ_{2}	—	October 24, 2000	Desert Beaver	W. K. Y. Yeung	EUN	3.8 km	MPC · JPL
98396	2000 US_{2}	—	October 24, 2000	Desert Beaver	W. K. Y. Yeung	·	3.2 km	MPC · JPL
98397	2000 UC_{3}	—	October 24, 2000	Črni Vrh	Črni Vrh	·	3.9 km	MPC · JPL
98398	2000 UE_{4}	—	October 24, 2000	Socorro	LINEAR	·	2.8 km	MPC · JPL
98399	2000 UP_{4}	—	October 24, 2000	Socorro	LINEAR	NYS ·	4.9 km	MPC · JPL
98400	2000 UR_{7}	—	October 24, 2000	Socorro	LINEAR	NYS ·	4.9 km	MPC · JPL

== 98401–98500 ==
back to top

Designation			Discovery			Properties		Ref
Permanent	Provisional	Named after	Date	Site	Discoverer(s)	Category	Diam.	Ref
98401	2000 UX_{7}	—	October 24, 2000	Socorro	LINEAR	V	1.7 km	MPC · JPL
98402	2000 UE_{8}	—	October 24, 2000	Socorro	LINEAR	·	1.8 km	MPC · JPL
98403	2000 UG_{8}	—	October 24, 2000	Socorro	LINEAR	·	2.9 km	MPC · JPL
98404	2000 UT_{8}	—	October 24, 2000	Socorro	LINEAR	·	3.4 km	MPC · JPL
98405	2000 UN_{9}	—	October 24, 2000	Socorro	LINEAR	MAR	3.2 km	MPC · JPL
98406	2000 UC_{10}	—	October 24, 2000	Socorro	LINEAR	·	2.2 km	MPC · JPL
98407	2000 UX_{10}	—	October 25, 2000	Socorro	LINEAR	·	2.4 km	MPC · JPL
98408	2000 UD_{11}	—	October 19, 2000	Olathe	Robinson, L.	·	3.1 km	MPC · JPL
98409	2000 UQ_{12}	—	October 25, 2000	Socorro	LINEAR	NYS	1.6 km	MPC · JPL
98410	2000 UX_{12}	—	October 25, 2000	Socorro	LINEAR	·	2.6 km	MPC · JPL
98411	2000 UT_{13}	—	October 24, 2000	Desert Beaver	W. K. Y. Yeung	·	2.4 km	MPC · JPL
98412	2000 UG_{15}	—	October 25, 2000	Socorro	LINEAR	·	2.2 km	MPC · JPL
98413	2000 UO_{16}	—	October 29, 2000	Fountain Hills	C. W. Juels	V	2.1 km	MPC · JPL
98414	2000 UE_{18}	—	October 24, 2000	Socorro	LINEAR	·	1.5 km	MPC · JPL
98415	2000 UH_{18}	—	October 24, 2000	Socorro	LINEAR	·	3.8 km	MPC · JPL
98416	2000 US_{20}	—	October 24, 2000	Socorro	LINEAR	·	3.4 km	MPC · JPL
98417	2000 UW_{21}	—	October 24, 2000	Socorro	LINEAR	NYS	1.8 km	MPC · JPL
98418	2000 US_{22}	—	October 24, 2000	Socorro	LINEAR	V	1.5 km	MPC · JPL
98419	2000 UV_{22}	—	October 24, 2000	Socorro	LINEAR	·	2.8 km	MPC · JPL
98420	2000 UN_{24}	—	October 24, 2000	Socorro	LINEAR	·	1.5 km	MPC · JPL
98421	2000 UD_{26}	—	October 24, 2000	Socorro	LINEAR	·	2.2 km	MPC · JPL
98422	2000 UO_{26}	—	October 24, 2000	Socorro	LINEAR	·	2.8 km	MPC · JPL
98423	2000 UU_{26}	—	October 24, 2000	Socorro	LINEAR	·	2.6 km	MPC · JPL
98424	2000 UO_{28}	—	October 25, 2000	Socorro	LINEAR	V	1.5 km	MPC · JPL
98425	2000 UM_{33}	—	October 30, 2000	Kitt Peak	Spacewatch	·	2.3 km	MPC · JPL
98426	2000 UE_{34}	—	October 24, 2000	Socorro	LINEAR	·	3.2 km	MPC · JPL
98427	2000 UA_{35}	—	October 24, 2000	Socorro	LINEAR	·	1.6 km	MPC · JPL
98428	2000 UE_{35}	—	October 24, 2000	Socorro	LINEAR	·	3.3 km	MPC · JPL
98429	2000 UL_{35}	—	October 24, 2000	Socorro	LINEAR	NYS	2.8 km	MPC · JPL
98430	2000 UN_{35}	—	October 24, 2000	Socorro	LINEAR	·	3.2 km	MPC · JPL
98431	2000 UA_{36}	—	October 24, 2000	Socorro	LINEAR	·	2.3 km	MPC · JPL
98432	2000 UR_{36}	—	October 24, 2000	Socorro	LINEAR	·	3.2 km	MPC · JPL
98433	2000 UP_{37}	—	October 24, 2000	Socorro	LINEAR	V	1.5 km	MPC · JPL
98434	2000 UF_{39}	—	October 24, 2000	Socorro	LINEAR	·	4.5 km	MPC · JPL
98435	2000 UE_{41}	—	October 24, 2000	Socorro	LINEAR	NYS	2.4 km	MPC · JPL
98436	2000 UF_{42}	—	October 24, 2000	Socorro	LINEAR	·	3.3 km	MPC · JPL
98437	2000 UP_{47}	—	October 24, 2000	Socorro	LINEAR	NYS	3.1 km	MPC · JPL
98438	2000 UH_{49}	—	October 24, 2000	Socorro	LINEAR	·	3.4 km	MPC · JPL
98439	2000 UD_{50}	—	October 24, 2000	Socorro	LINEAR	·	2.7 km	MPC · JPL
98440	2000 UN_{50}	—	October 24, 2000	Socorro	LINEAR	·	4.7 km	MPC · JPL
98441	2000 UW_{54}	—	October 24, 2000	Socorro	LINEAR	slow	4.2 km	MPC · JPL
98442	2000 UT_{55}	—	October 24, 2000	Socorro	LINEAR	(5)	2.5 km	MPC · JPL
98443	2000 UZ_{56}	—	October 25, 2000	Socorro	LINEAR	·	1.3 km	MPC · JPL
98444	2000 UM_{57}	—	October 25, 2000	Socorro	LINEAR	·	2.2 km	MPC · JPL
98445	2000 UG_{59}	—	October 25, 2000	Socorro	LINEAR	·	1.9 km	MPC · JPL
98446	2000 UM_{59}	—	October 25, 2000	Socorro	LINEAR	·	3.2 km	MPC · JPL
98447	2000 UE_{60}	—	October 25, 2000	Socorro	LINEAR	·	1.5 km	MPC · JPL
98448	2000 UN_{60}	—	October 25, 2000	Socorro	LINEAR	·	1.6 km	MPC · JPL
98449	2000 UM_{61}	—	October 25, 2000	Socorro	LINEAR	V	1.7 km	MPC · JPL
98450	2000 US_{62}	—	October 25, 2000	Socorro	LINEAR	V	1.5 km	MPC · JPL
98451	2000 UT_{63}	—	October 25, 2000	Socorro	LINEAR	V	1.6 km	MPC · JPL
98452	2000 UB_{65}	—	October 25, 2000	Socorro	LINEAR	·	2.0 km	MPC · JPL
98453	2000 UL_{66}	—	October 25, 2000	Socorro	LINEAR	·	2.9 km	MPC · JPL
98454	2000 US_{66}	—	October 25, 2000	Socorro	LINEAR	·	1.8 km	MPC · JPL
98455	2000 UF_{68}	—	October 25, 2000	Socorro	LINEAR	V	1.3 km	MPC · JPL
98456	2000 UD_{69}	—	October 25, 2000	Socorro	LINEAR	·	2.0 km	MPC · JPL
98457	2000 UE_{69}	—	October 25, 2000	Socorro	LINEAR	·	4.4 km	MPC · JPL
98458	2000 UP_{70}	—	October 25, 2000	Socorro	LINEAR	·	1.9 km	MPC · JPL
98459	2000 UZ_{72}	—	October 25, 2000	Socorro	LINEAR	·	3.0 km	MPC · JPL
98460	2000 UM_{73}	—	October 26, 2000	Socorro	LINEAR	NYS	1.9 km	MPC · JPL
98461	2000 UQ_{76}	—	October 24, 2000	Socorro	LINEAR	NYS	2.6 km	MPC · JPL
98462	2000 UB_{79}	—	October 24, 2000	Socorro	LINEAR	·	2.7 km	MPC · JPL
98463	2000 UL_{81}	—	October 24, 2000	Socorro	LINEAR	PHO	6.8 km	MPC · JPL
98464	2000 UP_{83}	—	October 31, 2000	Socorro	LINEAR	NYS	3.0 km	MPC · JPL
98465	2000 UN_{84}	—	October 31, 2000	Socorro	LINEAR	·	1.4 km	MPC · JPL
98466	2000 UF_{91}	—	October 25, 2000	Socorro	LINEAR	·	1.3 km	MPC · JPL
98467	2000 UW_{91}	—	October 25, 2000	Socorro	LINEAR	·	2.1 km	MPC · JPL
98468	2000 UM_{92}	—	October 25, 2000	Socorro	LINEAR	·	3.9 km	MPC · JPL
98469	2000 UF_{93}	—	October 25, 2000	Socorro	LINEAR	·	1.7 km	MPC · JPL
98470	2000 US_{94}	—	October 25, 2000	Socorro	LINEAR	·	2.2 km	MPC · JPL
98471	2000 UW_{94}	—	October 25, 2000	Socorro	LINEAR	·	2.9 km	MPC · JPL
98472	2000 UB_{95}	—	October 25, 2000	Socorro	LINEAR	·	3.0 km	MPC · JPL
98473	2000 UD_{96}	—	October 25, 2000	Socorro	LINEAR	·	3.1 km	MPC · JPL
98474	2000 UR_{97}	—	October 25, 2000	Socorro	LINEAR	·	1.5 km	MPC · JPL
98475	2000 UF_{98}	—	October 25, 2000	Socorro	LINEAR	·	4.0 km	MPC · JPL
98476	2000 UP_{98}	—	October 25, 2000	Socorro	LINEAR	V	1.2 km	MPC · JPL
98477	2000 UR_{99}	—	October 25, 2000	Socorro	LINEAR	·	3.0 km	MPC · JPL
98478	2000 UB_{100}	—	October 25, 2000	Socorro	LINEAR	·	2.1 km	MPC · JPL
98479	2000 UM_{100}	—	October 25, 2000	Socorro	LINEAR	V	1.9 km	MPC · JPL
98480	2000 UR_{100}	—	October 25, 2000	Socorro	LINEAR	V	1.5 km	MPC · JPL
98481	2000 UX_{100}	—	October 25, 2000	Socorro	LINEAR	·	3.0 km	MPC · JPL
98482	2000 UL_{101}	—	October 25, 2000	Socorro	LINEAR	·	4.0 km	MPC · JPL
98483	2000 UJ_{102}	—	October 25, 2000	Socorro	LINEAR	·	2.3 km	MPC · JPL
98484	2000 UK_{103}	—	October 25, 2000	Socorro	LINEAR	·	2.1 km	MPC · JPL
98485	2000 US_{105}	—	October 29, 2000	Socorro	LINEAR	V	1.6 km	MPC · JPL
98486	2000 UZ_{105}	—	October 29, 2000	Socorro	LINEAR	·	1.7 km	MPC · JPL
98487	2000 UC_{106}	—	October 29, 2000	Socorro	LINEAR	·	2.4 km	MPC · JPL
98488	2000 UM_{106}	—	October 30, 2000	Socorro	LINEAR	·	2.7 km	MPC · JPL
98489	2000 UR_{106}	—	October 30, 2000	Socorro	LINEAR	·	4.2 km	MPC · JPL
98490	2000 UJ_{108}	—	October 30, 2000	Socorro	LINEAR	V	1.2 km	MPC · JPL
98491	2000 UA_{109}	—	October 31, 2000	Socorro	LINEAR	V	1.3 km	MPC · JPL
98492	2000 UU_{109}	—	October 31, 2000	Socorro	LINEAR	·	3.4 km	MPC · JPL
98493	2000 UY_{110}	—	October 26, 2000	Kitt Peak	Spacewatch	NYS	1.9 km	MPC · JPL
98494 Marsupilami	2000 UN_{111}	Marsupilami	October 27, 2000	Le Creusot	J.-C. Merlin	NYS ·	2.2 km	MPC · JPL
98495	2000 VV_{2}	—	November 1, 2000	Desert Beaver	W. K. Y. Yeung	·	2.8 km	MPC · JPL
98496	2000 VT_{3}	—	November 1, 2000	Socorro	LINEAR	·	3.7 km	MPC · JPL
98497	2000 VL_{5}	—	November 1, 2000	Socorro	LINEAR	·	2.4 km	MPC · JPL
98498	2000 VS_{10}	—	November 1, 2000	Socorro	LINEAR	NYS	2.6 km	MPC · JPL
98499	2000 VW_{11}	—	November 1, 2000	Socorro	LINEAR	·	2.2 km	MPC · JPL
98500	2000 VL_{12}	—	November 1, 2000	Socorro	LINEAR	·	2.1 km	MPC · JPL

== 98501–98600 ==
back to top

Designation			Discovery			Properties		Ref
Permanent	Provisional	Named after	Date	Site	Discoverer(s)	Category	Diam.	Ref
98501	2000 VS_{12}	—	November 1, 2000	Socorro	LINEAR	·	2.3 km	MPC · JPL
98502	2000 VD_{15}	—	November 1, 2000	Socorro	LINEAR	·	1.6 km	MPC · JPL
98503	2000 VK_{15}	—	November 1, 2000	Socorro	LINEAR	·	3.0 km	MPC · JPL
98504	2000 VY_{15}	—	November 1, 2000	Socorro	LINEAR	NYS	3.1 km	MPC · JPL
98505	2000 VC_{16}	—	November 1, 2000	Socorro	LINEAR	·	3.6 km	MPC · JPL
98506	2000 VR_{16}	—	November 1, 2000	Socorro	LINEAR	EUN	3.3 km	MPC · JPL
98507	2000 VK_{18}	—	November 1, 2000	Socorro	LINEAR	NYS	2.9 km	MPC · JPL
98508	2000 VV_{19}	—	November 1, 2000	Socorro	LINEAR	·	2.9 km	MPC · JPL
98509	2000 VK_{20}	—	November 1, 2000	Socorro	LINEAR	·	1.6 km	MPC · JPL
98510	2000 VR_{22}	—	November 1, 2000	Socorro	LINEAR	·	3.1 km	MPC · JPL
98511	2000 VM_{23}	—	November 1, 2000	Socorro	LINEAR	NYS	2.2 km	MPC · JPL
98512	2000 VR_{24}	—	November 1, 2000	Socorro	LINEAR	MAR	2.4 km	MPC · JPL
98513	2000 VA_{25}	—	November 1, 2000	Socorro	LINEAR	MAS	1.4 km	MPC · JPL
98514	2000 VA_{26}	—	November 1, 2000	Socorro	LINEAR	·	2.8 km	MPC · JPL
98515	2000 VB_{26}	—	November 1, 2000	Socorro	LINEAR	·	3.2 km	MPC · JPL
98516	2000 VW_{26}	—	November 1, 2000	Socorro	LINEAR	·	1.6 km	MPC · JPL
98517	2000 VQ_{27}	—	November 1, 2000	Socorro	LINEAR	·	2.8 km	MPC · JPL
98518	2000 VX_{27}	—	November 1, 2000	Socorro	LINEAR	·	1.8 km	MPC · JPL
98519	2000 VJ_{28}	—	November 1, 2000	Socorro	LINEAR	·	2.8 km	MPC · JPL
98520	2000 VC_{29}	—	November 1, 2000	Socorro	LINEAR	·	2.0 km	MPC · JPL
98521	2000 VP_{29}	—	November 1, 2000	Socorro	LINEAR	·	2.4 km	MPC · JPL
98522	2000 VZ_{29}	—	November 1, 2000	Socorro	LINEAR	PHO	2.8 km	MPC · JPL
98523	2000 VO_{30}	—	November 1, 2000	Socorro	LINEAR	·	3.5 km	MPC · JPL
98524	2000 VT_{30}	—	November 1, 2000	Socorro	LINEAR	·	2.6 km	MPC · JPL
98525	2000 VF_{31}	—	November 1, 2000	Socorro	LINEAR	NYS	3.2 km	MPC · JPL
98526	2000 VG_{31}	—	November 1, 2000	Socorro	LINEAR	NYS	2.5 km	MPC · JPL
98527	2000 VN_{32}	—	November 1, 2000	Socorro	LINEAR	·	3.1 km	MPC · JPL
98528	2000 VU_{32}	—	November 1, 2000	Socorro	LINEAR	MAS	1.7 km	MPC · JPL
98529	2000 VY_{33}	—	November 1, 2000	Socorro	LINEAR	·	2.0 km	MPC · JPL
98530	2000 VR_{34}	—	November 1, 2000	Socorro	LINEAR	NYS	4.1 km	MPC · JPL
98531	2000 VK_{38}	—	November 1, 2000	Desert Beaver	W. K. Y. Yeung	·	2.5 km	MPC · JPL
98532	2000 VM_{42}	—	November 1, 2000	Socorro	LINEAR	·	3.3 km	MPC · JPL
98533	2000 VQ_{42}	—	November 1, 2000	Socorro	LINEAR	·	2.2 km	MPC · JPL
98534	2000 VC_{46}	—	November 3, 2000	Socorro	LINEAR	PHO	2.8 km	MPC · JPL
98535	2000 VM_{46}	—	November 3, 2000	Socorro	LINEAR	·	1.9 km	MPC · JPL
98536	2000 VN_{46}	—	November 3, 2000	Socorro	LINEAR	·	3.5 km	MPC · JPL
98537	2000 VC_{47}	—	November 3, 2000	Socorro	LINEAR	·	3.7 km	MPC · JPL
98538	2000 VQ_{48}	—	November 2, 2000	Socorro	LINEAR	·	2.4 km	MPC · JPL
98539	2000 VS_{48}	—	November 2, 2000	Socorro	LINEAR	·	3.4 km	MPC · JPL
98540	2000 VW_{48}	—	November 2, 2000	Socorro	LINEAR	NYS	1.9 km	MPC · JPL
98541	2000 VO_{49}	—	November 2, 2000	Socorro	LINEAR	V	1.8 km	MPC · JPL
98542	2000 VA_{51}	—	November 3, 2000	Socorro	LINEAR	·	2.1 km	MPC · JPL
98543	2000 VQ_{51}	—	November 3, 2000	Socorro	LINEAR	·	1.3 km	MPC · JPL
98544	2000 VB_{55}	—	November 3, 2000	Socorro	LINEAR	NYS	3.0 km	MPC · JPL
98545	2000 VE_{55}	—	November 3, 2000	Socorro	LINEAR	·	2.5 km	MPC · JPL
98546	2000 VO_{55}	—	November 3, 2000	Socorro	LINEAR	·	1.6 km	MPC · JPL
98547	2000 VE_{56}	—	November 3, 2000	Socorro	LINEAR	·	2.5 km	MPC · JPL
98548	2000 VR_{56}	—	November 3, 2000	Socorro	LINEAR	V	1.4 km	MPC · JPL
98549	2000 VY_{56}	—	November 3, 2000	Socorro	LINEAR	NYS	1.9 km	MPC · JPL
98550	2000 VR_{60}	—	November 1, 2000	Socorro	LINEAR	·	3.0 km	MPC · JPL
98551	2000 WK_{1}	—	November 18, 2000	Prescott	P. G. Comba	·	2.5 km	MPC · JPL
98552	2000 WL_{5}	—	November 19, 2000	Socorro	LINEAR	·	2.3 km	MPC · JPL
98553	2000 WO_{6}	—	November 18, 2000	Anderson Mesa	LONEOS	·	1.5 km	MPC · JPL
98554	2000 WP_{6}	—	November 18, 2000	Socorro	LINEAR	·	2.1 km	MPC · JPL
98555	2000 WD_{7}	—	November 19, 2000	Socorro	LINEAR	·	5.8 km	MPC · JPL
98556	2000 WQ_{7}	—	November 20, 2000	Socorro	LINEAR	·	2.1 km	MPC · JPL
98557	2000 WT_{7}	—	November 20, 2000	Socorro	LINEAR	·	1.9 km	MPC · JPL
98558	2000 WB_{10}	—	November 22, 2000	Bisei SG Center	BATTeRS	·	2.5 km	MPC · JPL
98559	2000 WB_{11}	—	November 22, 2000	Haleakala	NEAT	·	2.6 km	MPC · JPL
98560	2000 WH_{11}	—	November 24, 2000	Elmira	Cecce, A. J.	EUN	2.2 km	MPC · JPL
98561	2000 WA_{14}	—	November 20, 2000	Socorro	LINEAR	·	4.3 km	MPC · JPL
98562	2000 WJ_{14}	—	November 20, 2000	Socorro	LINEAR	·	2.6 km	MPC · JPL
98563	2000 WX_{16}	—	November 21, 2000	Socorro	LINEAR	·	3.3 km	MPC · JPL
98564	2000 WW_{17}	—	November 21, 2000	Socorro	LINEAR	·	2.9 km	MPC · JPL
98565	2000 WX_{17}	—	November 21, 2000	Socorro	LINEAR	NYS	2.1 km	MPC · JPL
98566	2000 WC_{19}	—	November 21, 2000	Socorro	LINEAR	·	2.8 km	MPC · JPL
98567	2000 WG_{19}	—	November 25, 2000	Fountain Hills	C. W. Juels	·	3.5 km	MPC · JPL
98568	2000 WZ_{19}	—	November 23, 2000	Kitt Peak	Spacewatch	·	2.2 km	MPC · JPL
98569	2000 WY_{20}	—	November 25, 2000	Kitt Peak	Spacewatch	V	1.3 km	MPC · JPL
98570	2000 WR_{23}	—	November 20, 2000	Socorro	LINEAR	V	1.3 km	MPC · JPL
98571	2000 WC_{25}	—	November 20, 2000	Socorro	LINEAR	·	6.8 km	MPC · JPL
98572	2000 WJ_{30}	—	November 20, 2000	Socorro	LINEAR	·	3.7 km	MPC · JPL
98573	2000 WQ_{31}	—	November 20, 2000	Socorro	LINEAR	·	2.4 km	MPC · JPL
98574	2000 WJ_{32}	—	November 20, 2000	Socorro	LINEAR	EUN	2.4 km	MPC · JPL
98575	2000 WQ_{35}	—	November 20, 2000	Socorro	LINEAR	(5)	3.3 km	MPC · JPL
98576	2000 WA_{38}	—	November 20, 2000	Socorro	LINEAR	·	1.5 km	MPC · JPL
98577	2000 WF_{39}	—	November 20, 2000	Socorro	LINEAR	MAR	3.3 km	MPC · JPL
98578	2000 WH_{39}	—	November 20, 2000	Socorro	LINEAR	·	2.7 km	MPC · JPL
98579	2000 WN_{40}	—	November 20, 2000	Socorro	LINEAR	·	2.2 km	MPC · JPL
98580	2000 WV_{40}	—	November 20, 2000	Socorro	LINEAR	·	2.7 km	MPC · JPL
98581	2000 WH_{41}	—	November 20, 2000	Socorro	LINEAR	·	7.7 km	MPC · JPL
98582	2000 WX_{41}	—	November 20, 2000	Socorro	LINEAR	MAS	2.0 km	MPC · JPL
98583	2000 WX_{43}	—	November 21, 2000	Socorro	LINEAR	·	1.7 km	MPC · JPL
98584	2000 WF_{44}	—	November 21, 2000	Socorro	LINEAR	·	1.3 km	MPC · JPL
98585	2000 WH_{44}	—	November 21, 2000	Socorro	LINEAR	EUN	3.7 km	MPC · JPL
98586	2000 WX_{44}	—	November 21, 2000	Socorro	LINEAR	·	5.8 km	MPC · JPL
98587	2000 WD_{50}	—	November 26, 2000	Socorro	LINEAR	MIS	4.4 km	MPC · JPL
98588	2000 WK_{50}	—	November 26, 2000	Socorro	LINEAR	·	3.0 km	MPC · JPL
98589	2000 WM_{54}	—	November 20, 2000	Socorro	LINEAR	·	3.6 km	MPC · JPL
98590	2000 WW_{54}	—	November 20, 2000	Socorro	LINEAR	·	3.6 km	MPC · JPL
98591	2000 WB_{55}	—	November 20, 2000	Socorro	LINEAR	·	2.8 km	MPC · JPL
98592	2000 WG_{55}	—	November 20, 2000	Socorro	LINEAR	·	5.6 km	MPC · JPL
98593	2000 WM_{55}	—	November 20, 2000	Socorro	LINEAR	EUN	2.8 km	MPC · JPL
98594	2000 WA_{56}	—	November 20, 2000	Socorro	LINEAR	·	3.0 km	MPC · JPL
98595	2000 WO_{57}	—	November 21, 2000	Socorro	LINEAR	NYS	2.6 km	MPC · JPL
98596	2000 WN_{58}	—	November 21, 2000	Socorro	LINEAR	·	2.6 km	MPC · JPL
98597	2000 WD_{59}	—	November 21, 2000	Socorro	LINEAR	·	2.4 km	MPC · JPL
98598	2000 WW_{59}	—	November 21, 2000	Socorro	LINEAR	·	2.2 km	MPC · JPL
98599	2000 WU_{60}	—	November 21, 2000	Socorro	LINEAR	V	2.8 km	MPC · JPL
98600	2000 WZ_{65}	—	November 28, 2000	Haleakala	NEAT	PHO	3.6 km	MPC · JPL

== 98601–98700 ==
back to top

Designation			Discovery			Properties		Ref
Permanent	Provisional	Named after	Date	Site	Discoverer(s)	Category	Diam.	Ref
98601	2000 WG_{66}	—	November 20, 2000	Socorro	LINEAR	BRU	7.6 km	MPC · JPL
98602	2000 WK_{69}	—	November 19, 2000	Socorro	LINEAR	V	1.7 km	MPC · JPL
98603	2000 WU_{69}	—	November 19, 2000	Socorro	LINEAR	V	1.6 km	MPC · JPL
98604	2000 WK_{70}	—	November 19, 2000	Socorro	LINEAR	V	1.6 km	MPC · JPL
98605	2000 WW_{70}	—	November 19, 2000	Socorro	LINEAR	V	1.4 km	MPC · JPL
98606	2000 WV_{71}	—	November 19, 2000	Socorro	LINEAR	·	2.9 km	MPC · JPL
98607	2000 WX_{72}	—	November 20, 2000	Socorro	LINEAR	·	1.8 km	MPC · JPL
98608	2000 WL_{75}	—	November 20, 2000	Socorro	LINEAR	·	1.3 km	MPC · JPL
98609	2000 WN_{75}	—	November 20, 2000	Socorro	LINEAR	V	1.2 km	MPC · JPL
98610	2000 WP_{76}	—	November 20, 2000	Socorro	LINEAR	·	1.8 km	MPC · JPL
98611	2000 WY_{77}	—	November 20, 2000	Socorro	LINEAR	·	1.5 km	MPC · JPL
98612	2000 WG_{78}	—	November 20, 2000	Socorro	LINEAR	·	2.1 km	MPC · JPL
98613	2000 WX_{78}	—	November 20, 2000	Socorro	LINEAR	·	2.2 km	MPC · JPL
98614	2000 WZ_{78}	—	November 20, 2000	Socorro	LINEAR	·	4.8 km	MPC · JPL
98615	2000 WZ_{80}	—	November 20, 2000	Socorro	LINEAR	·	4.5 km	MPC · JPL
98616	2000 WH_{81}	—	November 20, 2000	Socorro	LINEAR	(5)	2.6 km	MPC · JPL
98617	2000 WQ_{81}	—	November 20, 2000	Socorro	LINEAR	·	3.0 km	MPC · JPL
98618	2000 WZ_{81}	—	November 20, 2000	Socorro	LINEAR	·	2.2 km	MPC · JPL
98619	2000 WG_{82}	—	November 20, 2000	Socorro	LINEAR	·	3.2 km	MPC · JPL
98620	2000 WU_{85}	—	November 20, 2000	Socorro	LINEAR	NYS	2.1 km	MPC · JPL
98621	2000 WN_{88}	—	November 20, 2000	Socorro	LINEAR	·	3.3 km	MPC · JPL
98622	2000 WJ_{89}	—	November 21, 2000	Socorro	LINEAR	MAS	1.9 km	MPC · JPL
98623	2000 WK_{90}	—	November 21, 2000	Socorro	LINEAR	·	5.1 km	MPC · JPL
98624	2000 WD_{93}	—	November 21, 2000	Socorro	LINEAR	·	5.4 km	MPC · JPL
98625	2000 WO_{93}	—	November 21, 2000	Socorro	LINEAR	·	1.7 km	MPC · JPL
98626	2000 WP_{98}	—	November 21, 2000	Socorro	LINEAR	·	3.2 km	MPC · JPL
98627	2000 WQ_{98}	—	November 21, 2000	Socorro	LINEAR	·	2.2 km	MPC · JPL
98628	2000 WF_{99}	—	November 21, 2000	Socorro	LINEAR	·	2.3 km	MPC · JPL
98629	2000 WO_{99}	—	November 21, 2000	Socorro	LINEAR	·	3.5 km	MPC · JPL
98630	2000 WW_{99}	—	November 21, 2000	Socorro	LINEAR	·	2.6 km	MPC · JPL
98631	2000 WT_{100}	—	November 21, 2000	Socorro	LINEAR	·	3.9 km	MPC · JPL
98632	2000 WQ_{103}	—	November 27, 2000	Socorro	LINEAR	slow	2.5 km	MPC · JPL
98633	2000 WG_{108}	—	November 20, 2000	Socorro	LINEAR	V	1.4 km	MPC · JPL
98634	2000 WF_{113}	—	November 20, 2000	Socorro	LINEAR	·	5.1 km	MPC · JPL
98635	2000 WA_{114}	—	November 20, 2000	Socorro	LINEAR	·	2.6 km	MPC · JPL
98636	2000 WR_{114}	—	November 20, 2000	Socorro	LINEAR	·	2.4 km	MPC · JPL
98637	2000 WP_{115}	—	November 20, 2000	Socorro	LINEAR	·	2.5 km	MPC · JPL
98638	2000 WJ_{118}	—	November 20, 2000	Socorro	LINEAR	·	2.8 km	MPC · JPL
98639	2000 WR_{118}	—	November 20, 2000	Socorro	LINEAR	V	1.7 km	MPC · JPL
98640	2000 WE_{121}	—	November 21, 2000	Socorro	LINEAR	(5)	2.1 km	MPC · JPL
98641	2000 WW_{122}	—	November 29, 2000	Socorro	LINEAR	·	3.1 km	MPC · JPL
98642	2000 WX_{123}	—	November 28, 2000	Kitt Peak	Spacewatch	·	2.8 km	MPC · JPL
98643	2000 WR_{125}	—	November 30, 2000	Socorro	LINEAR	·	2.4 km	MPC · JPL
98644	2000 WA_{126}	—	November 30, 2000	Socorro	LINEAR	·	2.1 km	MPC · JPL
98645	2000 WF_{129}	—	November 19, 2000	Kitt Peak	Spacewatch	·	3.1 km	MPC · JPL
98646	2000 WH_{134}	—	November 19, 2000	Socorro	LINEAR	V	1.3 km	MPC · JPL
98647	2000 WK_{134}	—	November 30, 2000	Socorro	LINEAR	·	6.4 km	MPC · JPL
98648	2000 WG_{135}	—	November 19, 2000	Socorro	LINEAR	ADE	3.9 km	MPC · JPL
98649	2000 WO_{138}	—	November 21, 2000	Socorro	LINEAR	·	2.0 km	MPC · JPL
98650	2000 WM_{140}	—	November 21, 2000	Socorro	LINEAR	V	1.7 km	MPC · JPL
98651	2000 WS_{143}	—	November 20, 2000	Socorro	LINEAR	·	2.5 km	MPC · JPL
98652	2000 WW_{143}	—	November 20, 2000	Socorro	LINEAR	(5)	2.4 km	MPC · JPL
98653	2000 WC_{144}	—	November 21, 2000	Socorro	LINEAR	·	3.6 km	MPC · JPL
98654	2000 WB_{146}	—	November 23, 2000	Haleakala	NEAT	·	1.6 km	MPC · JPL
98655	2000 WX_{146}	—	November 28, 2000	Haleakala	NEAT	·	4.7 km	MPC · JPL
98656	2000 WY_{148}	—	November 29, 2000	Haleakala	NEAT	·	2.9 km	MPC · JPL
98657	2000 WB_{149}	—	November 29, 2000	Haleakala	NEAT	·	3.2 km	MPC · JPL
98658	2000 WT_{153}	—	November 29, 2000	Socorro	LINEAR	GEF	3.6 km	MPC · JPL
98659	2000 WU_{154}	—	November 30, 2000	Socorro	LINEAR	·	1.5 km	MPC · JPL
98660	2000 WD_{155}	—	November 30, 2000	Socorro	LINEAR	·	2.3 km	MPC · JPL
98661	2000 WG_{155}	—	November 30, 2000	Socorro	LINEAR	·	3.0 km	MPC · JPL
98662	2000 WN_{155}	—	November 30, 2000	Socorro	LINEAR	V	1.5 km	MPC · JPL
98663	2000 WO_{156}	—	November 30, 2000	Socorro	LINEAR	V	1.4 km	MPC · JPL
98664	2000 WR_{158}	—	November 30, 2000	Haleakala	NEAT	·	2.8 km	MPC · JPL
98665	2000 WH_{159}	—	November 19, 2000	Socorro	LINEAR	PHO	3.3 km	MPC · JPL
98666	2000 WC_{161}	—	November 20, 2000	Anderson Mesa	LONEOS	·	4.7 km	MPC · JPL
98667	2000 WE_{163}	—	November 20, 2000	Socorro	LINEAR	·	3.4 km	MPC · JPL
98668	2000 WY_{163}	—	November 21, 2000	Socorro	LINEAR	·	1.7 km	MPC · JPL
98669	2000 WR_{164}	—	November 22, 2000	Haleakala	NEAT	·	3.9 km	MPC · JPL
98670	2000 WC_{165}	—	November 22, 2000	Haleakala	NEAT	·	3.1 km	MPC · JPL
98671	2000 WK_{165}	—	November 23, 2000	Haleakala	NEAT	EUN ·	3.7 km	MPC · JPL
98672	2000 WL_{167}	—	November 24, 2000	Anderson Mesa	LONEOS	·	2.3 km	MPC · JPL
98673	2000 WU_{167}	—	November 24, 2000	Anderson Mesa	LONEOS	EOS	4.1 km	MPC · JPL
98674	2000 WQ_{168}	—	November 25, 2000	Anderson Mesa	LONEOS	(5)	2.7 km	MPC · JPL
98675	2000 WV_{168}	—	November 25, 2000	Anderson Mesa	LONEOS	GEF	2.8 km	MPC · JPL
98676	2000 WQ_{169}	—	November 26, 2000	Socorro	LINEAR	·	2.4 km	MPC · JPL
98677	2000 WC_{173}	—	November 25, 2000	Anderson Mesa	LONEOS	·	4.5 km	MPC · JPL
98678	2000 WF_{173}	—	November 25, 2000	Anderson Mesa	LONEOS	·	3.7 km	MPC · JPL
98679	2000 WT_{176}	—	November 27, 2000	Socorro	LINEAR	MIS	5.2 km	MPC · JPL
98680	2000 WE_{178}	—	November 28, 2000	Kitt Peak	Spacewatch	MAS	1.5 km	MPC · JPL
98681	2000 WQ_{178}	—	November 29, 2000	Socorro	LINEAR	NYS	2.7 km	MPC · JPL
98682	2000 WR_{180}	—	November 29, 2000	Anderson Mesa	LONEOS	PHO	3.8 km	MPC · JPL
98683	2000 WY_{180}	—	November 29, 2000	Socorro	LINEAR	V	1.5 km	MPC · JPL
98684	2000 WD_{187}	—	November 18, 2000	Anderson Mesa	LONEOS	·	5.9 km	MPC · JPL
98685	2000 WM_{192}	—	November 20, 2000	Socorro	LINEAR	NYS	2.5 km	MPC · JPL
98686	2000 XV_{2}	—	December 1, 2000	Socorro	LINEAR	·	2.9 km	MPC · JPL
98687	2000 XH_{3}	—	December 1, 2000	Socorro	LINEAR	·	3.4 km	MPC · JPL
98688	2000 XG_{8}	—	December 1, 2000	Socorro	LINEAR	·	3.7 km	MPC · JPL
98689	2000 XV_{9}	—	December 1, 2000	Socorro	LINEAR	EUN	3.0 km	MPC · JPL
98690	2000 XD_{10}	—	December 1, 2000	Socorro	LINEAR	·	3.0 km	MPC · JPL
98691	2000 XL_{14}	—	December 5, 2000	Bisei SG Center	BATTeRS	·	3.4 km	MPC · JPL
98692	2000 XS_{14}	—	December 2, 2000	Haleakala	NEAT	PHO	2.6 km	MPC · JPL
98693	2000 XO_{16}	—	December 1, 2000	Socorro	LINEAR	V	1.2 km	MPC · JPL
98694	2000 XD_{21}	—	December 4, 2000	Socorro	LINEAR	V	1.3 km	MPC · JPL
98695	2000 XX_{23}	—	December 4, 2000	Socorro	LINEAR	·	2.9 km	MPC · JPL
98696	2000 XY_{23}	—	December 4, 2000	Socorro	LINEAR	·	2.2 km	MPC · JPL
98697	2000 XQ_{27}	—	December 4, 2000	Socorro	LINEAR	·	2.6 km	MPC · JPL
98698	2000 XQ_{28}	—	December 4, 2000	Socorro	LINEAR	·	3.2 km	MPC · JPL
98699	2000 XW_{28}	—	December 4, 2000	Socorro	LINEAR	EUN	3.3 km	MPC · JPL
98700	2000 XQ_{30}	—	December 4, 2000	Socorro	LINEAR	PHO	3.3 km	MPC · JPL

== 98701–98800 ==
back to top

Designation			Discovery			Properties		Ref
Permanent	Provisional	Named after	Date	Site	Discoverer(s)	Category	Diam.	Ref
98701	2000 XS_{30}	—	December 4, 2000	Socorro	LINEAR	·	2.2 km	MPC · JPL
98702	2000 XX_{31}	—	December 4, 2000	Socorro	LINEAR	·	3.4 km	MPC · JPL
98703	2000 XE_{33}	—	December 4, 2000	Socorro	LINEAR	TIR	7.2 km	MPC · JPL
98704	2000 XJ_{34}	—	December 4, 2000	Socorro	LINEAR	·	3.4 km	MPC · JPL
98705	2000 XT_{35}	—	December 5, 2000	Socorro	LINEAR	·	2.1 km	MPC · JPL
98706	2000 XY_{36}	—	December 5, 2000	Socorro	LINEAR	·	6.0 km	MPC · JPL
98707	2000 XL_{37}	—	December 5, 2000	Socorro	LINEAR	EUN	3.0 km	MPC · JPL
98708	2000 XO_{38}	—	December 5, 2000	Socorro	LINEAR	·	8.6 km	MPC · JPL
98709	2000 XQ_{38}	—	December 5, 2000	Socorro	LINEAR	·	5.3 km	MPC · JPL
98710	2000 XZ_{38}	—	December 5, 2000	Socorro	LINEAR	·	4.1 km	MPC · JPL
98711	2000 XH_{42}	—	December 5, 2000	Socorro	LINEAR	·	2.7 km	MPC · JPL
98712	2000 XT_{42}	—	December 5, 2000	Socorro	LINEAR	EUN	3.9 km	MPC · JPL
98713	2000 XH_{43}	—	December 5, 2000	Socorro	LINEAR	fast	3.4 km	MPC · JPL
98714	2000 XU_{47}	—	December 4, 2000	Socorro	LINEAR	·	2.0 km	MPC · JPL
98715	2000 XH_{48}	—	December 4, 2000	Socorro	LINEAR	·	8.7 km	MPC · JPL
98716	2000 XH_{49}	—	December 4, 2000	Socorro	LINEAR	·	3.5 km	MPC · JPL
98717	2000 XL_{49}	—	December 4, 2000	Socorro	LINEAR	·	3.0 km	MPC · JPL
98718	2000 XX_{49}	—	December 4, 2000	Socorro	LINEAR	·	5.6 km	MPC · JPL
98719	2000 XT_{52}	—	December 6, 2000	Socorro	LINEAR	EOS	4.8 km	MPC · JPL
98720	2000 XC_{54}	—	December 5, 2000	Socorro	LINEAR	MAR	2.9 km	MPC · JPL
98721	2000 YV_{5}	—	December 19, 2000	Socorro	LINEAR	V	2.5 km	MPC · JPL
98722 Elenaumberto	2000 YJ_{8}	Elenaumberto	December 22, 2000	Ceccano	G. Masi	EUN	2.6 km	MPC · JPL
98723	2000 YY_{11}	—	December 22, 2000	Haleakala	NEAT	EUN	2.4 km	MPC · JPL
98724	2000 YF_{14}	—	December 23, 2000	Kitt Peak	Spacewatch	·	3.3 km	MPC · JPL
98725	2000 YP_{14}	—	December 23, 2000	Kleť	Kleť	·	2.4 km	MPC · JPL
98726	2000 YW_{15}	—	December 22, 2000	Anderson Mesa	LONEOS	·	2.8 km	MPC · JPL
98727	2000 YN_{16}	—	December 26, 2000	Kleť	Kleť	NYS	2.9 km	MPC · JPL
98728	2000 YG_{21}	—	December 29, 2000	Desert Beaver	W. K. Y. Yeung	·	3.1 km	MPC · JPL
98729	2000 YW_{25}	—	December 22, 2000	Socorro	LINEAR	·	4.8 km	MPC · JPL
98730	2000 YM_{26}	—	December 28, 2000	Socorro	LINEAR	·	4.0 km	MPC · JPL
98731	2000 YF_{30}	—	December 29, 2000	Haleakala	NEAT	RAF	2.2 km	MPC · JPL
98732	2000 YR_{30}	—	December 22, 2000	Needville	Needville	·	2.5 km	MPC · JPL
98733	2000 YT_{30}	—	December 29, 2000	Needville	Needville	HNS	3.0 km	MPC · JPL
98734	2000 YQ_{33}	—	December 30, 2000	Desert Beaver	W. K. Y. Yeung	·	2.5 km	MPC · JPL
98735	2000 YC_{34}	—	December 28, 2000	Socorro	LINEAR	·	3.5 km	MPC · JPL
98736	2000 YO_{35}	—	December 30, 2000	Socorro	LINEAR	NYS ·	2.8 km	MPC · JPL
98737	2000 YC_{36}	—	December 30, 2000	Socorro	LINEAR	·	2.4 km	MPC · JPL
98738	2000 YG_{38}	—	December 30, 2000	Socorro	LINEAR	·	4.9 km	MPC · JPL
98739	2000 YR_{40}	—	December 30, 2000	Socorro	LINEAR	·	2.9 km	MPC · JPL
98740	2000 YN_{43}	—	December 30, 2000	Socorro	LINEAR	·	2.8 km	MPC · JPL
98741	2000 YH_{45}	—	December 30, 2000	Socorro	LINEAR	NYS	3.3 km	MPC · JPL
98742	2000 YM_{45}	—	December 30, 2000	Socorro	LINEAR	·	2.3 km	MPC · JPL
98743	2000 YA_{46}	—	December 30, 2000	Socorro	LINEAR	NYS	3.6 km	MPC · JPL
98744	2000 YM_{46}	—	December 30, 2000	Socorro	LINEAR	·	2.8 km	MPC · JPL
98745	2000 YB_{47}	—	December 30, 2000	Socorro	LINEAR	·	3.9 km	MPC · JPL
98746	2000 YQ_{49}	—	December 30, 2000	Socorro	LINEAR	(5)	2.5 km	MPC · JPL
98747	2000 YV_{50}	—	December 30, 2000	Socorro	LINEAR	·	3.1 km	MPC · JPL
98748	2000 YP_{51}	—	December 30, 2000	Socorro	LINEAR	·	2.1 km	MPC · JPL
98749	2000 YS_{51}	—	December 30, 2000	Socorro	LINEAR	·	3.4 km	MPC · JPL
98750	2000 YJ_{52}	—	December 30, 2000	Socorro	LINEAR	·	2.2 km	MPC · JPL
98751	2000 YN_{52}	—	December 30, 2000	Socorro	LINEAR	·	2.9 km	MPC · JPL
98752	2000 YK_{53}	—	December 30, 2000	Socorro	LINEAR	·	2.2 km	MPC · JPL
98753	2000 YW_{53}	—	December 30, 2000	Socorro	LINEAR	·	3.2 km	MPC · JPL
98754	2000 YV_{54}	—	December 30, 2000	Socorro	LINEAR	·	2.8 km	MPC · JPL
98755	2000 YF_{58}	—	December 30, 2000	Socorro	LINEAR	·	3.6 km	MPC · JPL
98756	2000 YL_{59}	—	December 30, 2000	Socorro	LINEAR	·	2.7 km	MPC · JPL
98757	2000 YZ_{61}	—	December 30, 2000	Socorro	LINEAR	·	5.2 km	MPC · JPL
98758	2000 YM_{63}	—	December 30, 2000	Socorro	LINEAR	DOR	5.4 km	MPC · JPL
98759	2000 YH_{68}	—	December 28, 2000	Socorro	LINEAR	·	7.8 km	MPC · JPL
98760	2000 YO_{68}	—	December 28, 2000	Socorro	LINEAR	·	2.6 km	MPC · JPL
98761	2000 YR_{68}	—	December 28, 2000	Socorro	LINEAR	·	3.7 km	MPC · JPL
98762	2000 YT_{68}	—	December 28, 2000	Socorro	LINEAR	(5)	2.4 km	MPC · JPL
98763	2000 YL_{69}	—	December 30, 2000	Socorro	LINEAR	·	2.6 km	MPC · JPL
98764	2000 YQ_{69}	—	December 30, 2000	Socorro	LINEAR	·	2.2 km	MPC · JPL
98765	2000 YP_{70}	—	December 30, 2000	Socorro	LINEAR	·	2.9 km	MPC · JPL
98766	2000 YF_{72}	—	December 30, 2000	Socorro	LINEAR	·	2.4 km	MPC · JPL
98767	2000 YV_{72}	—	December 30, 2000	Socorro	LINEAR	MAS	1.9 km	MPC · JPL
98768	2000 YD_{75}	—	December 30, 2000	Socorro	LINEAR	·	3.4 km	MPC · JPL
98769	2000 YE_{75}	—	December 30, 2000	Socorro	LINEAR	·	2.6 km	MPC · JPL
98770	2000 YN_{77}	—	December 30, 2000	Socorro	LINEAR	·	1.7 km	MPC · JPL
98771	2000 YN_{78}	—	December 30, 2000	Socorro	LINEAR	NYS	2.2 km	MPC · JPL
98772	2000 YP_{78}	—	December 30, 2000	Socorro	LINEAR	·	2.8 km	MPC · JPL
98773	2000 YW_{79}	—	December 30, 2000	Socorro	LINEAR	·	3.1 km	MPC · JPL
98774	2000 YM_{80}	—	December 30, 2000	Socorro	LINEAR	·	4.7 km	MPC · JPL
98775	2000 YD_{82}	—	December 30, 2000	Socorro	LINEAR	·	2.7 km	MPC · JPL
98776	2000 YN_{84}	—	December 30, 2000	Socorro	LINEAR	·	6.3 km	MPC · JPL
98777	2000 YV_{85}	—	December 30, 2000	Socorro	LINEAR	MAR	2.7 km	MPC · JPL
98778	2000 YX_{85}	—	December 30, 2000	Socorro	LINEAR	slow	9.5 km	MPC · JPL
98779	2000 YJ_{86}	—	December 30, 2000	Socorro	LINEAR	(5)	2.3 km	MPC · JPL
98780	2000 YZ_{90}	—	December 30, 2000	Socorro	LINEAR	·	3.4 km	MPC · JPL
98781	2000 YF_{91}	—	December 30, 2000	Socorro	LINEAR	MAS	1.7 km	MPC · JPL
98782	2000 YS_{92}	—	December 30, 2000	Socorro	LINEAR	·	2.3 km	MPC · JPL
98783	2000 YB_{93}	—	December 30, 2000	Socorro	LINEAR	NYS	2.4 km	MPC · JPL
98784	2000 YU_{93}	—	December 30, 2000	Socorro	LINEAR	·	4.8 km	MPC · JPL
98785	2000 YR_{94}	—	December 30, 2000	Socorro	LINEAR	·	3.4 km	MPC · JPL
98786	2000 YR_{96}	—	December 30, 2000	Socorro	LINEAR	·	3.7 km	MPC · JPL
98787	2000 YP_{97}	—	December 30, 2000	Socorro	LINEAR	EUN	3.6 km	MPC · JPL
98788	2000 YQ_{98}	—	December 30, 2000	Socorro	LINEAR	(5)	3.0 km	MPC · JPL
98789	2000 YF_{99}	—	December 30, 2000	Socorro	LINEAR	MAR	2.3 km	MPC · JPL
98790	2000 YW_{99}	—	December 30, 2000	Socorro	LINEAR	·	2.2 km	MPC · JPL
98791	2000 YW_{104}	—	December 28, 2000	Socorro	LINEAR	·	5.5 km	MPC · JPL
98792	2000 YR_{105}	—	December 28, 2000	Socorro	LINEAR	·	6.2 km	MPC · JPL
98793	2000 YT_{106}	—	December 30, 2000	Socorro	LINEAR	·	2.0 km	MPC · JPL
98794	2000 YX_{109}	—	December 30, 2000	Socorro	LINEAR	V	1.3 km	MPC · JPL
98795	2000 YJ_{110}	—	December 30, 2000	Socorro	LINEAR	·	2.8 km	MPC · JPL
98796	2000 YD_{111}	—	December 30, 2000	Socorro	LINEAR	·	3.0 km	MPC · JPL
98797	2000 YS_{111}	—	December 30, 2000	Socorro	LINEAR	NYS	2.8 km	MPC · JPL
98798	2000 YW_{111}	—	December 30, 2000	Socorro	LINEAR	(5)	2.2 km	MPC · JPL
98799	2000 YZ_{111}	—	December 30, 2000	Socorro	LINEAR	NYS	2.7 km	MPC · JPL
98800	2000 YN_{114}	—	December 30, 2000	Socorro	LINEAR	·	5.1 km	MPC · JPL

== 98801–98900 ==
back to top

Designation			Discovery			Properties		Ref
Permanent	Provisional	Named after	Date	Site	Discoverer(s)	Category	Diam.	Ref
98801	2000 YZ_{114}	—	December 30, 2000	Socorro	LINEAR	·	2.6 km	MPC · JPL
98802	2000 YB_{115}	—	December 30, 2000	Socorro	LINEAR	·	2.8 km	MPC · JPL
98803	2000 YE_{115}	—	December 30, 2000	Socorro	LINEAR	·	2.7 km	MPC · JPL
98804	2000 YD_{117}	—	December 30, 2000	Socorro	LINEAR	(5)	3.4 km	MPC · JPL
98805	2000 YM_{117}	—	December 30, 2000	Socorro	LINEAR	EOS	4.6 km	MPC · JPL
98806	2000 YU_{117}	—	December 30, 2000	Socorro	LINEAR	PHO	4.4 km	MPC · JPL
98807	2000 YK_{118}	—	December 30, 2000	Socorro	LINEAR	·	6.2 km	MPC · JPL
98808	2000 YP_{118}	—	December 28, 2000	Socorro	LINEAR	·	5.5 km	MPC · JPL
98809	2000 YD_{119}	—	December 31, 2000	Anderson Mesa	LONEOS	·	5.9 km	MPC · JPL
98810	2000 YR_{119}	—	December 17, 2000	Kitt Peak	Spacewatch	·	2.4 km	MPC · JPL
98811	2000 YS_{119}	—	December 17, 2000	Kitt Peak	Spacewatch	MAR	3.0 km	MPC · JPL
98812	2000 YP_{120}	—	December 19, 2000	Socorro	LINEAR	·	3.4 km	MPC · JPL
98813	2000 YX_{120}	—	December 20, 2000	Socorro	LINEAR	·	4.7 km	MPC · JPL
98814	2000 YC_{122}	—	December 28, 2000	Kitt Peak	Spacewatch	V	1.4 km	MPC · JPL
98815	2000 YR_{123}	—	December 28, 2000	Kitt Peak	Spacewatch	·	3.2 km	MPC · JPL
98816	2000 YU_{123}	—	December 28, 2000	Kitt Peak	Spacewatch	·	3.2 km	MPC · JPL
98817	2000 YQ_{124}	—	December 29, 2000	Anderson Mesa	LONEOS	·	4.0 km	MPC · JPL
98818	2000 YH_{125}	—	December 29, 2000	Anderson Mesa	LONEOS	·	3.8 km	MPC · JPL
98819	2000 YC_{129}	—	December 29, 2000	Haleakala	NEAT	·	4.1 km	MPC · JPL
98820	2000 YL_{130}	—	December 30, 2000	Socorro	LINEAR	·	3.0 km	MPC · JPL
98821	2000 YV_{131}	—	December 30, 2000	Socorro	LINEAR	·	2.7 km	MPC · JPL
98822	2000 YR_{132}	—	December 30, 2000	Anderson Mesa	LONEOS	·	7.3 km	MPC · JPL
98823	2000 YF_{135}	—	December 17, 2000	Anderson Mesa	LONEOS	·	3.4 km	MPC · JPL
98824	2000 YS_{135}	—	December 20, 2000	Kitt Peak	Spacewatch	·	2.6 km	MPC · JPL
98825 Maryellen	2000 YF_{139}	Maryellen	December 27, 2000	Kanab	Sheridan, E. E.	·	2.4 km	MPC · JPL
98826	2000 YF_{140}	—	December 31, 2000	Anderson Mesa	LONEOS	fast	5.7 km	MPC · JPL
98827	2001 AW	—	January 1, 2001	Kitt Peak	Spacewatch	THM	4.1 km	MPC · JPL
98828	2001 AP_{3}	—	January 2, 2001	Socorro	LINEAR	·	3.8 km	MPC · JPL
98829	2001 AG_{4}	—	January 2, 2001	Socorro	LINEAR	·	3.7 km	MPC · JPL
98830	2001 AP_{4}	—	January 2, 2001	Socorro	LINEAR	·	3.7 km	MPC · JPL
98831	2001 AR_{4}	—	January 2, 2001	Socorro	LINEAR	(5)	2.1 km	MPC · JPL
98832	2001 AL_{5}	—	January 2, 2001	Socorro	LINEAR	·	2.5 km	MPC · JPL
98833	2001 AF_{12}	—	January 2, 2001	Socorro	LINEAR	·	3.0 km	MPC · JPL
98834	2001 AR_{15}	—	January 2, 2001	Socorro	LINEAR	GEF	2.4 km	MPC · JPL
98835	2001 AS_{15}	—	January 2, 2001	Socorro	LINEAR	·	3.0 km	MPC · JPL
98836	2001 AF_{17}	—	January 2, 2001	Socorro	LINEAR	·	2.7 km	MPC · JPL
98837	2001 AQ_{17}	—	January 2, 2001	Socorro	LINEAR	·	2.9 km	MPC · JPL
98838	2001 AH_{19}	—	January 4, 2001	Haleakala	NEAT	·	2.9 km	MPC · JPL
98839	2001 AT_{20}	—	January 3, 2001	Socorro	LINEAR	HNS	2.9 km	MPC · JPL
98840	2001 AA_{22}	—	January 3, 2001	Socorro	LINEAR	·	3.1 km	MPC · JPL
98841	2001 AL_{22}	—	January 3, 2001	Socorro	LINEAR	·	2.3 km	MPC · JPL
98842	2001 AQ_{22}	—	January 3, 2001	Socorro	LINEAR	·	3.9 km	MPC · JPL
98843	2001 AQ_{26}	—	January 5, 2001	Socorro	LINEAR	(194)	3.9 km	MPC · JPL
98844	2001 AP_{27}	—	January 5, 2001	Socorro	LINEAR	GEF	2.6 km	MPC · JPL
98845	2001 AU_{27}	—	January 5, 2001	Socorro	LINEAR	·	2.8 km	MPC · JPL
98846	2001 AV_{27}	—	January 5, 2001	Socorro	LINEAR	·	2.6 km	MPC · JPL
98847	2001 AW_{29}	—	January 4, 2001	Socorro	LINEAR	·	4.9 km	MPC · JPL
98848	2001 AT_{30}	—	January 4, 2001	Socorro	LINEAR	·	3.1 km	MPC · JPL
98849	2001 AY_{30}	—	January 4, 2001	Socorro	LINEAR	·	3.5 km	MPC · JPL
98850	2001 AM_{33}	—	January 4, 2001	Socorro	LINEAR	·	3.1 km	MPC · JPL
98851	2001 AW_{33}	—	January 4, 2001	Socorro	LINEAR	·	5.2 km	MPC · JPL
98852	2001 AJ_{34}	—	January 4, 2001	Socorro	LINEAR	PAD	4.8 km	MPC · JPL
98853	2001 AY_{34}	—	January 4, 2001	Socorro	LINEAR	·	4.4 km	MPC · JPL
98854	2001 AU_{36}	—	January 5, 2001	Socorro	LINEAR	·	2.0 km	MPC · JPL
98855	2001 AU_{37}	—	January 5, 2001	Socorro	LINEAR	EUN	3.0 km	MPC · JPL
98856	2001 AA_{38}	—	January 5, 2001	Socorro	LINEAR	·	7.8 km	MPC · JPL
98857	2001 AM_{38}	—	January 5, 2001	Socorro	LINEAR	·	3.0 km	MPC · JPL
98858	2001 AT_{41}	—	January 3, 2001	Socorro	LINEAR	EUN	2.3 km	MPC · JPL
98859	2001 AZ_{41}	—	January 3, 2001	Socorro	LINEAR	·	2.7 km	MPC · JPL
98860	2001 AK_{42}	—	January 4, 2001	Socorro	LINEAR	MAR	2.6 km	MPC · JPL
98861	2001 AA_{44}	—	January 7, 2001	Socorro	LINEAR	PHO	6.0 km	MPC · JPL
98862	2001 AN_{44}	—	January 15, 2001	Oizumi	T. Kobayashi	(5)	2.8 km	MPC · JPL
98863	2001 AR_{46}	—	January 15, 2001	Socorro	LINEAR	PHO	4.6 km	MPC · JPL
98864	2001 AR_{47}	—	January 15, 2001	Socorro	LINEAR	·	4.5 km	MPC · JPL
98865	2001 AY_{47}	—	January 15, 2001	Socorro	LINEAR	·	3.9 km	MPC · JPL
98866 Giannabussolari	2001 AC_{53}	Giannabussolari	January 15, 2001	Cima Ekar	ADAS	V	1.6 km	MPC · JPL
98867	2001 BG_{4}	—	January 18, 2001	Socorro	LINEAR	·	5.0 km	MPC · JPL
98868	2001 BS_{5}	—	January 18, 2001	Socorro	LINEAR	·	5.4 km	MPC · JPL
98869	2001 BT_{5}	—	January 18, 2001	Socorro	LINEAR	·	3.1 km	MPC · JPL
98870	2001 BV_{5}	—	January 18, 2001	Socorro	LINEAR	EUN	2.8 km	MPC · JPL
98871	2001 BB_{7}	—	January 19, 2001	Socorro	LINEAR	·	2.3 km	MPC · JPL
98872	2001 BO_{9}	—	January 19, 2001	Socorro	LINEAR	·	2.6 km	MPC · JPL
98873	2001 BO_{11}	—	January 20, 2001	Gnosca	S. Sposetti	·	1.8 km	MPC · JPL
98874	2001 BE_{14}	—	January 19, 2001	Kitt Peak	Spacewatch	·	4.8 km	MPC · JPL
98875	2001 BN_{15}	—	January 21, 2001	Oizumi	T. Kobayashi	(5)	4.0 km	MPC · JPL
98876	2001 BL_{17}	—	January 19, 2001	Socorro	LINEAR	·	2.7 km	MPC · JPL
98877	2001 BK_{19}	—	January 19, 2001	Socorro	LINEAR	EUN	2.5 km	MPC · JPL
98878	2001 BT_{21}	—	January 20, 2001	Socorro	LINEAR	KOR	3.4 km	MPC · JPL
98879	2001 BC_{24}	—	January 20, 2001	Socorro	LINEAR	·	4.7 km	MPC · JPL
98880	2001 BF_{25}	—	January 20, 2001	Socorro	LINEAR	·	2.3 km	MPC · JPL
98881	2001 BQ_{25}	—	January 20, 2001	Socorro	LINEAR	·	3.4 km	MPC · JPL
98882	2001 BG_{28}	—	January 20, 2001	Socorro	LINEAR	·	4.4 km	MPC · JPL
98883	2001 BY_{28}	—	January 20, 2001	Socorro	LINEAR	·	3.8 km	MPC · JPL
98884	2001 BL_{29}	—	January 20, 2001	Socorro	LINEAR	·	3.9 km	MPC · JPL
98885	2001 BX_{29}	—	January 20, 2001	Socorro	LINEAR	KOR	3.1 km	MPC · JPL
98886	2001 BZ_{29}	—	January 20, 2001	Socorro	LINEAR	PHO	2.7 km	MPC · JPL
98887	2001 BQ_{34}	—	January 20, 2001	Socorro	LINEAR	·	3.0 km	MPC · JPL
98888	2001 BW_{34}	—	January 20, 2001	Socorro	LINEAR	(5)	2.1 km	MPC · JPL
98889	2001 BL_{38}	—	January 18, 2001	Socorro	LINEAR	·	3.7 km	MPC · JPL
98890	2001 BH_{40}	—	January 18, 2001	Socorro	LINEAR	MAR	3.2 km	MPC · JPL
98891	2001 BK_{41}	—	January 19, 2001	Kitt Peak	Spacewatch	·	2.5 km	MPC · JPL
98892	2001 BX_{42}	—	January 19, 2001	Socorro	LINEAR	·	2.7 km	MPC · JPL
98893	2001 BB_{44}	—	January 19, 2001	Socorro	LINEAR	(5)	2.9 km	MPC · JPL
98894	2001 BC_{44}	—	January 19, 2001	Socorro	LINEAR	·	2.2 km	MPC · JPL
98895	2001 BE_{44}	—	January 19, 2001	Socorro	LINEAR	·	3.0 km	MPC · JPL
98896	2001 BK_{44}	—	January 19, 2001	Socorro	LINEAR	(194)	3.1 km	MPC · JPL
98897	2001 BL_{44}	—	January 19, 2001	Socorro	LINEAR	·	7.3 km	MPC · JPL
98898	2001 BU_{45}	—	January 21, 2001	Socorro	LINEAR	·	4.1 km	MPC · JPL
98899	2001 BG_{48}	—	January 21, 2001	Socorro	LINEAR	·	2.5 km	MPC · JPL
98900	2001 BF_{50}	—	January 21, 2001	Socorro	LINEAR	EUN	3.5 km	MPC · JPL

== 98901–99000 ==
back to top

Designation			Discovery			Properties		Ref
Permanent	Provisional	Named after	Date	Site	Discoverer(s)	Category	Diam.	Ref
98901	2001 BB_{51}	—	January 28, 2001	Oizumi	T. Kobayashi	HNS	2.5 km	MPC · JPL
98902	2001 BK_{53}	—	January 17, 2001	Haleakala	NEAT	EUN	2.9 km	MPC · JPL
98903	2001 BB_{57}	—	January 19, 2001	Kitt Peak	Spacewatch	·	2.6 km	MPC · JPL
98904	2001 BD_{57}	—	January 19, 2001	Haleakala	NEAT	·	5.6 km	MPC · JPL
98905	2001 BL_{58}	—	January 21, 2001	Socorro	LINEAR	·	2.6 km	MPC · JPL
98906	2001 BR_{58}	—	January 21, 2001	Socorro	LINEAR	·	2.3 km	MPC · JPL
98907	2001 BM_{59}	—	January 26, 2001	Socorro	LINEAR	EUN ·	6.0 km	MPC · JPL
98908	2001 BZ_{59}	—	January 26, 2001	Socorro	LINEAR	(5)	3.0 km	MPC · JPL
98909	2001 BR_{60}	—	January 21, 2001	Socorro	LINEAR	BRG	3.1 km	MPC · JPL
98910	2001 BE_{62}	—	January 26, 2001	Socorro	LINEAR	·	2.3 km	MPC · JPL
98911	2001 BJ_{63}	—	January 29, 2001	Socorro	LINEAR	(5)	2.7 km	MPC · JPL
98912	2001 BM_{63}	—	January 29, 2001	Socorro	LINEAR	·	3.3 km	MPC · JPL
98913	2001 BG_{65}	—	January 26, 2001	Socorro	LINEAR	·	3.6 km	MPC · JPL
98914	2001 BL_{66}	—	January 26, 2001	Socorro	LINEAR	·	2.6 km	MPC · JPL
98915	2001 BJ_{67}	—	January 30, 2001	Socorro	LINEAR	·	3.8 km	MPC · JPL
98916	2001 BU_{68}	—	January 31, 2001	Socorro	LINEAR	MAR	5.2 km	MPC · JPL
98917	2001 BY_{70}	—	January 29, 2001	Socorro	LINEAR	·	2.1 km	MPC · JPL
98918	2001 BG_{72}	—	January 31, 2001	Socorro	LINEAR	slow	4.7 km	MPC · JPL
98919	2001 BN_{74}	—	January 31, 2001	Socorro	LINEAR	·	3.2 km	MPC · JPL
98920	2001 BX_{74}	—	January 31, 2001	Socorro	LINEAR	EUN	2.8 km	MPC · JPL
98921	2001 BW_{76}	—	January 26, 2001	Socorro	LINEAR	·	4.2 km	MPC · JPL
98922	2001 BY_{76}	—	January 26, 2001	Socorro	LINEAR	·	3.7 km	MPC · JPL
98923	2001 BB_{78}	—	January 25, 2001	Haleakala	NEAT	·	4.6 km	MPC · JPL
98924	2001 BG_{82}	—	January 18, 2001	Socorro	LINEAR	MAR	2.5 km	MPC · JPL
98925	2001 CX	—	February 1, 2001	Socorro	LINEAR	·	3.8 km	MPC · JPL
98926	2001 CH_{1}	—	February 1, 2001	Socorro	LINEAR	·	2.9 km	MPC · JPL
98927	2001 CF_{2}	—	February 1, 2001	Socorro	LINEAR	·	6.0 km	MPC · JPL
98928	2001 CH_{2}	—	February 1, 2001	Socorro	LINEAR	·	2.6 km	MPC · JPL
98929	2001 CE_{4}	—	February 1, 2001	Socorro	LINEAR	·	2.0 km	MPC · JPL
98930	2001 CB_{5}	—	February 1, 2001	Socorro	LINEAR	EUN	2.9 km	MPC · JPL
98931	2001 CC_{5}	—	February 1, 2001	Socorro	LINEAR	JUN	2.2 km	MPC · JPL
98932	2001 CZ_{6}	—	February 1, 2001	Socorro	LINEAR	·	3.0 km	MPC · JPL
98933	2001 CS_{7}	—	February 1, 2001	Socorro	LINEAR	·	4.2 km	MPC · JPL
98934	2001 CA_{8}	—	February 1, 2001	Socorro	LINEAR	(5)	1.9 km	MPC · JPL
98935	2001 CV_{10}	—	February 1, 2001	Socorro	LINEAR	·	13 km	MPC · JPL
98936	2001 CX_{10}	—	February 1, 2001	Socorro	LINEAR	·	4.9 km	MPC · JPL
98937	2001 CO_{11}	—	February 1, 2001	Socorro	LINEAR	(6769)	4.5 km	MPC · JPL
98938	2001 CQ_{13}	—	February 1, 2001	Socorro	LINEAR	·	4.0 km	MPC · JPL
98939	2001 CZ_{15}	—	February 1, 2001	Socorro	LINEAR	·	3.2 km	MPC · JPL
98940	2001 CJ_{18}	—	February 2, 2001	Socorro	LINEAR	·	3.1 km	MPC · JPL
98941	2001 CH_{20}	—	February 3, 2001	Socorro	LINEAR	EUN	2.5 km	MPC · JPL
98942	2001 CP_{20}	—	February 3, 2001	Socorro	LINEAR	·	6.5 km	MPC · JPL
98943 Torifune	2001 CC_{21}	Torifune	February 3, 2001	Socorro	LINEAR	APO	640 m	MPC · JPL
98944	2001 CM_{21}	—	February 1, 2001	Anderson Mesa	LONEOS	·	2.8 km	MPC · JPL
98945	2001 CS_{21}	—	February 1, 2001	Anderson Mesa	LONEOS	·	3.4 km	MPC · JPL
98946	2001 CB_{22}	—	February 1, 2001	Anderson Mesa	LONEOS	·	4.1 km	MPC · JPL
98947	2001 CZ_{23}	—	February 1, 2001	Anderson Mesa	LONEOS	·	4.9 km	MPC · JPL
98948	2001 CK_{24}	—	February 1, 2001	Anderson Mesa	LONEOS	·	2.8 km	MPC · JPL
98949	2001 CM_{27}	—	February 2, 2001	Anderson Mesa	LONEOS	·	6.9 km	MPC · JPL
98950	2001 CO_{28}	—	February 2, 2001	Anderson Mesa	LONEOS	·	6.6 km	MPC · JPL
98951	2001 CV_{28}	—	February 2, 2001	Anderson Mesa	LONEOS	·	6.8 km	MPC · JPL
98952	2001 CW_{28}	—	February 2, 2001	Anderson Mesa	LONEOS	·	8.9 km	MPC · JPL
98953	2001 CZ_{29}	—	February 2, 2001	Anderson Mesa	LONEOS	NAE	7.8 km	MPC · JPL
98954	2001 CJ_{32}	—	February 12, 2001	Črni Vrh	Matičič, S.	·	2.8 km	MPC · JPL
98955	2001 CE_{34}	—	February 13, 2001	Socorro	LINEAR	EUP	10 km	MPC · JPL
98956	2001 CW_{34}	—	February 13, 2001	Socorro	LINEAR	·	5.4 km	MPC · JPL
98957	2001 CH_{36}	—	February 15, 2001	Oizumi	T. Kobayashi	·	3.7 km	MPC · JPL
98958	2001 CD_{38}	—	February 15, 2001	Socorro	LINEAR	·	10 km	MPC · JPL
98959	2001 CG_{39}	—	February 13, 2001	Socorro	LINEAR	EUN	2.4 km	MPC · JPL
98960	2001 CG_{43}	—	February 15, 2001	Socorro	LINEAR	INA	9.6 km	MPC · JPL
98961	2001 CP_{43}	—	February 15, 2001	Socorro	LINEAR	·	7.0 km	MPC · JPL
98962	2001 CZ_{43}	—	February 15, 2001	Socorro	LINEAR	·	4.6 km	MPC · JPL
98963	2001 CO_{44}	—	February 15, 2001	Socorro	LINEAR	·	7.5 km	MPC · JPL
98964	2001 CR_{44}	—	February 15, 2001	Socorro	LINEAR	EUN	2.5 km	MPC · JPL
98965	2001 CL_{45}	—	February 15, 2001	Socorro	LINEAR	·	2.7 km	MPC · JPL
98966	2001 CW_{47}	—	February 12, 2001	Anderson Mesa	LONEOS	·	2.7 km	MPC · JPL
98967	2001 DT_{2}	—	February 16, 2001	Prescott	P. G. Comba	·	7.5 km	MPC · JPL
98968	2001 DA_{4}	—	February 16, 2001	Socorro	LINEAR	·	2.8 km	MPC · JPL
98969	2001 DJ_{12}	—	February 17, 2001	Socorro	LINEAR	·	2.8 km	MPC · JPL
98970	2001 DL_{12}	—	February 17, 2001	Socorro	LINEAR	·	5.2 km	MPC · JPL
98971	2001 DR_{12}	—	February 17, 2001	Socorro	LINEAR	·	2.6 km	MPC · JPL
98972	2001 DT_{14}	—	February 20, 2001	Oaxaca	Roe, J. M.	AGN	2.8 km	MPC · JPL
98973	2001 DB_{15}	—	February 17, 2001	Črni Vrh	Matičič, S.	·	2.2 km	MPC · JPL
98974	2001 DY_{15}	—	February 16, 2001	Socorro	LINEAR	·	3.0 km	MPC · JPL
98975	2001 DY_{16}	—	February 16, 2001	Socorro	LINEAR	·	2.4 km	MPC · JPL
98976	2001 DZ_{18}	—	February 16, 2001	Socorro	LINEAR	·	4.5 km	MPC · JPL
98977	2001 DF_{19}	—	February 16, 2001	Socorro	LINEAR	·	4.3 km	MPC · JPL
98978	2001 DG_{19}	—	February 16, 2001	Socorro	LINEAR	GEF	3.7 km	MPC · JPL
98979	2001 DB_{21}	—	February 16, 2001	Socorro	LINEAR	·	2.8 km	MPC · JPL
98980	2001 DF_{21}	—	February 16, 2001	Socorro	LINEAR	·	4.3 km	MPC · JPL
98981	2001 DQ_{21}	—	February 16, 2001	Socorro	LINEAR	·	5.1 km	MPC · JPL
98982	2001 DS_{22}	—	February 17, 2001	Socorro	LINEAR	·	3.4 km	MPC · JPL
98983	2001 DD_{25}	—	February 17, 2001	Socorro	LINEAR	·	3.5 km	MPC · JPL
98984	2001 DK_{25}	—	February 17, 2001	Socorro	LINEAR	URS · slow	6.8 km	MPC · JPL
98985	2001 DS_{25}	—	February 17, 2001	Socorro	LINEAR	·	2.5 km	MPC · JPL
98986	2001 DB_{26}	—	February 17, 2001	Socorro	LINEAR	·	2.1 km	MPC · JPL
98987	2001 DG_{26}	—	February 17, 2001	Socorro	LINEAR	·	4.3 km	MPC · JPL
98988	2001 DY_{27}	—	February 17, 2001	Socorro	LINEAR	CYB	6.4 km	MPC · JPL
98989	2001 DE_{31}	—	February 17, 2001	Socorro	LINEAR	·	2.4 km	MPC · JPL
98990	2001 DA_{34}	—	February 17, 2001	Socorro	LINEAR	·	2.6 km	MPC · JPL
98991	2001 DH_{35}	—	February 19, 2001	Socorro	LINEAR	KOR	2.6 km	MPC · JPL
98992	2001 DV_{35}	—	February 19, 2001	Socorro	LINEAR	·	2.1 km	MPC · JPL
98993	2001 DC_{36}	—	February 19, 2001	Socorro	LINEAR	PAD	4.1 km	MPC · JPL
98994	2001 DK_{39}	—	February 19, 2001	Socorro	LINEAR	·	3.4 km	MPC · JPL
98995	2001 DA_{41}	—	February 19, 2001	Socorro	LINEAR	·	4.5 km	MPC · JPL
98996	2001 DF_{44}	—	February 19, 2001	Socorro	LINEAR	·	5.4 km	MPC · JPL
98997	2001 DR_{45}	—	February 19, 2001	Socorro	LINEAR	·	3.1 km	MPC · JPL
98998	2001 DU_{46}	—	February 19, 2001	Socorro	LINEAR	·	2.6 km	MPC · JPL
98999	2001 DE_{48}	—	February 16, 2001	Socorro	LINEAR	·	2.2 km	MPC · JPL
99000	2001 DU_{48}	—	February 16, 2001	Socorro	LINEAR	EOS	4.1 km	MPC · JPL

back to top

== See also ==
- Meanings of minor-planet names: 98001–99000
