= Meanings of minor-planet names: 98001–99000 =

As minor planet discoveries are confirmed, they are given a permanent number by the IAU's Minor Planet Center (MPC), and the discoverers can then submit names for them, following the IAU's naming conventions. The list below concerns those minor planets in the specified number-range that have received names, and explains the meanings of those names.

Official naming citations of newly named small Solar System bodies are approved and published in a bulletin by IAU's Working Group for Small Bodies Nomenclature (WGSBN). Before May 2021, citations were published in MPC's Minor Planet Circulars for many decades. Recent citations can also be found on the JPL Small-Body Database (SBDB). Until his death in 2016, German astronomer Lutz D. Schmadel compiled these citations into the Dictionary of Minor Planet Names (DMP) and regularly updated the collection.

Based on Paul Herget's The Names of the Minor Planets, Schmadel also researched the unclear origin of numerous asteroids, most of which had been named prior to World War II. This article incorporates text from this source, which is in the public domain: SBDB New namings may only be added to this list below after official publication as the preannouncement of names is condemned. The WGSBN publishes a comprehensive guideline for the naming rules of non-cometary small Solar System bodies.

== 98001–98100 ==
Named minor planet	Provisional	This minor planet was named for...	Ref · Catalog
There are no named minor planets in this number range

== 98101–98200 ==
back to top

Named minor planet	Provisional	This minor planet was named for...	Ref · Catalog
98127 Vilgusová	2000 SP_{24}	Hedvika Vilgusová (1946–2007) was a Czech illustrator of books of tales that have been published in several European countries. Her great empathy for a child's soul has resulted in her illustrations having a very positive charge of humanity.	JPL · 98127

== 98201–98300 ==
back to top

Named minor planet	Provisional	This minor planet was named for...	Ref · Catalog
There are no named minor planets in this number range

== 98301–98400 ==
back to top

Named minor planet	Provisional	This minor planet was named for...	Ref · Catalog
There are no named minor planets in this number range

== 98401–98500 ==
back to top

Named minor planet	Provisional	This minor planet was named for...	Ref · Catalog
98494 Marsupilami	2000 UN_{111}	Marsupilami, comic-strip character created by the Belgian cartoonist André Franquin. A playful, gluttonous wag, the Marsupilami first appeared in January 1952 in Spirou and Fantasio magazine, where it shouted out its first "Houba!"	JPL · 98494

== 98501–98600 ==
back to top

Named minor planet	Provisional	This minor planet was named for...	Ref · Catalog
There are no named minor planets in this number range

== 98601–98700 ==
back to top

Named minor planet	Provisional	This minor planet was named for...	Ref · Catalog
There are no named minor planets in this number range

== 98701–98800 ==
back to top

Named minor planet	Provisional	This minor planet was named for...	Ref · Catalog
98722 Elenaumberto	2000 YJ_{8}	Elena Persichilli (born 1940) and Umberto Masi (born 1926) are the parents of the Italian discoverer, Gianluca Masi, who expresses eternal gratitude to them. This citation celebrates the great importance they had in supporting him over the last 26 years, since the beginning of his interest in astronomy, up to his professional involvement with this science.	JPL · 98722

== 98801–98900 ==
back to top

Named minor planet	Provisional	This minor planet was named for...	Ref · Catalog
98825 Maryellen	2000 YF_{139}	Mary Ellen Craven, companion and partner of American astronomer Edwin E. Sheridan, who discovered this minor planet	JPL · 98825
98866 Giannabussolari	2001 AC_{53}	Gianna Bussolari (born 1943) has been a beloved teacher for three decades. Mother of three, she is very much appreciated by a worldwide community of astronomers as a charming guest and hostess, deserving substantial credit for the success of several astronomical conferences organized in Padova.	JPL · 98866

== 98901–99000 ==
back to top

Named minor planet	Provisional	This minor planet was named for...	Ref · Catalog
98943 Torifune	2001 CC_{21}	Torifune (an abbreviation of Ame-no-torifune), a god in Japanese mythology.	IAU · 98943

back to top

Preceded by 97,001–98,000	Meanings of minor-planet names List of minor planets: 98,001–99,000	Succeeded by 99,001–100,000
