= ASKAP J1935+2148 =

Slow spinning neutron star or magnetar

Observation data Epoch J2000 Equinox J2000
- Constellation: Vulpecula
- Right ascension: 19^{h} 35^{m} 5.126^{s}
- Declination: 21° 48′ 41.047″

Characteristics
- Evolutionary stage: Neutron star or magnetar (suspected)

Astrometry
Distance	4,850 pc

Details
Rotation	53.8 minutes

Database references
SIMBAD	data

ASKAP J1935+2148 (also known as ASKAP J193505.1+214841.0) is a neutron star/magnetar candidate located in the constellation Vulpecula, approximately 15,800 light-years away. With a rotation period of 53.8 minutes (more precisely, 3,225.313±0.002 seconds), it would be the slowest spinning neutron star ever discovered.

== Discovery and observations ==
ASKAP J1935+2148 was discovered while observing the same area as gamma-ray burst GRB 221009A, which had occurred a few days earlier, with the first pulses being detected on 15 October 2022 by the Australian Square Kilometre Array Pathfinder telescope, located in Western Australia, from which it derives its name. The first observation lasted six hours, in which four 10- to 50-second pulses were detected, with the peak flux density being 119 mJy. During the observation, ASKAP was operating in the square_6 by 6 configuration with 1.05° pitch and a central frequency of 887.5 MHz. The observation field also encompassed the magnetar SGR 1935+2154, which had produced fast radio bursts in 2020.

ASKAP J1935+2148 was also detected in four subsequent observations, with the pulses visible across the entire observing band of 288 MHz. The pulses were quantified to be >90% linearly polarised with a rotation measure of 159.3±0.3 rad m^{−2}, consistent with nearby pulsars. Observations at 1,284 MHz with the MeerKAT radio interferometer, including estimating the time of arrival of future pulses, were used to determine a rotation period of 3,225.313±0.002 seconds.

== Properties ==
ASKAP J1935+2148 goes through three phases every rotation period, which were also detected by the MeerKAT telescope: the first phase is characterised by bright and highly linear polarised pulses, lasting between 10 and 50 seconds, the second phase is characterised by weak and circularly polarised pulses 26 times weaker than in the first phase, lasting approximately 370 milliseconds, and the third phase is characterised by quiescence, with no activity. Another pulsar, PSR J1107−5907, shows similar phases, and pulsars PSR B0823+26 and PSR B2111+46 have shown similar activity.

== Explanations ==
There are two possible explanations for ASKAP J1935+2148.

The first explanation is that the object is a white dwarf with an unusually strong magnetic field; the second is that the object is a neutron star emitting radiation from its poles despite its slow rotation.

== See also ==
- GPM J1839−10
- GLEAM-X J162759.5−523504.3
- GCRT J1745−3009
- PSR J0901–4046
- Rotating radio transient
- Long Period Radio Transients
