= Manisha Caleb =

Indian-Australian astrophysicist

Manisha Pranati Caleb is an Indian and Australian astrophysicist whose research has used interferometry to detect fast radio bursts, studied the local context of fast radio bursts, used their signals as probes into the distribution of matter in the universe, and discovered repeating signals from what may be very slowly-rotating neutron stars. She is a lecturer at the University of Sydney, in the Sydney Institute for Astronomy.

== Education and career ==
Caleb was a student at Stella Maris College, Chennai in India from 2007 to 2010. She went to University College London in England for a master's degree involving spacecraft and satellite communications. Next, she became a doctoral student at the Australian National University, where she began her work on fast radio bursts. Her 2017 doctoral dissertation, A pursuit of fast radio transients with the UTMOST and Parkes radio telescopes, was jointly supervised by Frank Briggs, Brian Schmidt, Matthew Bailes, and Chris Flynn.

She became a postdoctoral researcher at the University of Manchester in England before returning to Australia for her present position as a lecturer in the Sydney Institute for Astronomy of the University of Sydney.

== Research ==
Some of Caleb's major results include the first use of interferometry to detect fast radio bursts, in 2017,^{[B]} confirmation of the extra-galactic origin of these bursts,^{[A]} and the discoveries of ultra-long-period pulsars PSR J0901–4046 in 2020, the former slowest known pulsar at roughly 76 seconds per pulse,^{[C]} and ASKAP J1935+2148 in 2024, with roughly 54 minutes per pulse.^{[D]}

== Selected publications ==
A.	Caleb, M.; Flynn, C.; Bailes, M.; Barr, E. D.; Hunstead, R. W.; Keane, E. F.; Ravi, V.; van Straten, W. (March 2016), "Are the distributions of fast radio burst properties consistent with a cosmological population?", Monthly Notices of the Royal Astronomical Society, 458 (1): 708–717, arXiv:1512.02738, doi:10.1093/mnras/stw175

B.	Caleb, M.; Flynn, C.; Bailes, M.; Barr, E. D.; Bateman, T.; Bhandari, S.; Campbell-Wilson, D.; Farah, W.; Green, A. J.; Hunstead, R. W.; Jameson, A.; Jankowski, F.; Keane, E. F.; Parthasarathy, A.; Ravi, V.; Rosado, P. A.; van Straten, W.; Venkatraman Krishnan, V. (March 2017), "The first interferometric detections of fast radio bursts", Monthly Notices of the Royal Astronomical Society, 468 (3): 3746–3756, arXiv:1703.10173, doi:10.1093/mnras/stx638

C.	Caleb, Manisha; Heywood, Ian; Rajwade, Kaustubh; Malenta, Mateusz; Willem Stappers, Benjamin; Barr, Ewan; Chen, Weiwei; Morello, Vincent; Sanidas, Sotiris; van den Eijnden, Jakob; Kramer, Michael; Buckley, David; Brink, Jaco; Motta, Sara Elisa; Woudt, Patrick; Weltevrede, Patrick; Jankowski, Fabian; Surnis, Mayuresh; Buchner, Sarah; Bezuidenhout, Mechiel Christiaan; Driessen, Laura Nicole; Fender, Rob (May 2022), "Discovery of a radio-emitting neutron star with an ultra-long spin period of 76 s", Nature Astronomy, 6 (7): 828–836, arXiv:2206.01346, Bibcode:2022NatAs...6..828C, doi:10.1038/s41550-022-01688-x, PMC 7613111, PMID 35880202

D.	Caleb, M.; Lenc, E.; Kaplan, D. L.; Murphy, T.; Men, Y. P.; Shannon, R. M.; Ferrario, L.; Rajwade, K. M.; Clarke, T. E.; Giacintucci, S.; Hurley-Walker, N.; Hyman, S. D.; Lower, M. E.; McSweeney, Sam; Ravi, V.; Barr, E. D.; Buchner, S.; Flynn, C. M. L.; Hessels, J. W. T.; Kramer, M.; Pritchard, J.; Stappers, B. W. (June 2024), "An emission-state-switching radio transient with a 54-minute period", Nature Astronomy, 8 (9): 1159–1168, arXiv:2407.12266, Bibcode:2024NatAs...8.1159C, doi:10.1038/s41550-024-02277-w
