= Long period radio transient =

New class of galactic astronomical transients - LPTs

A long-period radio transient (LPT) is a type of galactic radio source that emit highly polarised, coherent, bursts of radio emission that regularly repeat, with periods ranging few minutes to several hours. Unlike classical pulsars, which are neutron stars that rotate on timescales of milliseconds to seconds, LPTs have periods orders of magnitude longer — often exceeding conventional theoretical limits for radio-emitting neutron stars. Their physical nature remains actively debated, with the hypotheses suggesting either slowly rotating magnetars or white dwarf–red dwarf binary systems, though isolated magnetic white dwarfs have been suggested as well. The first LPT associated with an accreting white dwarf binary was discovered in June 2026.

The first hint of such a phenomenon was the detection of GCRT J1745−3009 near the Galactic Centre in 2005. Since 2022 there has been a wave of discoveries, driven by wide-field radio telescopes such as the Murchison Widefield Array (MWA) and the CSIRO's Australian SKA Pathfinder (ASKAP), which have established LPTs as a distinct and growing class of astrophysical object. As of 2026, roughly 12 confirmed LPTs are known, and dedicated surveys continue to expand the sample.

== Characteristics ==
LPTs are defined by several observational properties that distinguish them from other known radio transients:

- Periods of minutes to hours — far longer than those of ordinary pulsars or millisecond pulsars (milliseconds to seconds).
- Highly polarised radio pulses — linear polarisation fractions commonly exceeding 70–90%, with circular fractions reaching 20–30%, consistent with coherent emission mechanisms such as those seen in canonical pulsars and repeating fast radio bursts (FRBs).
- Pulse durations of from seconds to tens of minutes, yielding duty cycles that can be quite large.
- Brightness temperatures far exceeding 10^{12} K, implying a coherent emission mechanism, and possible relativistic magnetised plasmas.
- Concentration toward the Galactic plane, though some sources are found at high Galactic latitudes.
- Emission activity that can be transient (lasting weeks to months) or persistent over decades, depending on the source.

Some LPTs exhibit emission-state switching — alternating between bright pulses, faint pulses, and quiescence — analogous to mode-changing behaviour in radio pulsars and magnetars. Notably, ASKAP J1935+2148 displays several distinct emission modes despite its 54-minute period. Some sources also show complex polarisation position angle swings consistent with the rotating vector models used for pulsars.

== Discovery history ==
=== Precursor: GCRT J1745−3009 (2005) ===
The earliest candidate LPT, GCRT J1745−3009, was detected by Hyman et al. in 2005 using archival Very Large Array (VLA) data at 330 MHz. It produced five bursts of roughly equal brightness, each lasting about 10 minutes, recurring every 77 minutes during a 7-hour window on 30 September – 1 October 2002. Its extremely high inferred brightness temperature (~10^{16} K if near the Galactic Centre) and morphology were unlike any known class of radio transient at the time, and it was provisionally categorised as a Galactic Center Radio Transient (GCRT). Its classification as an LPT remains debated owing to the lack of subsequent detections and uncertainty about its distance.

=== Modern era (2022–present) ===
The modern LPT era began in 2022 when Hurley-Walker et al. reported GLEAM-X J162759.5−523504.3 using the Murchison Widefield Array, with a period of approximately 18 minutes. The source emitted highly polarised pulses for several months before becoming quiescent. That same year, Caleb et al. discovered a new long-period pulsar, using the MeerKAT radio telescope, with a 76 second spin period. In 2023, Hurley-Walker et al. discovered GPM J1839−10, which has a 21-minute pulsation period and was subsequently found to have been active for at least 35 years through archival searches extending back to 1988 — making it the longest-lived known LPT.

From 2024 onward, the discovery rate accelerated significantly, driven by increasing wide-field surveys with ASKAP, LOFAR, and CHIME. Notable additions include ASKAP J1935+2148 (54-minute period), ASKAP J1832−0911 (which has also been detected in X-rays), and several other systems suspected to binary systems containing white dwarf with an M-dwarf companion.

To date, ASKAP J1745-5051 is the only LPT with pulsations in X-ray and radio constrained to an orbital period. It is also the only LPT associated with a cataclysmic variable, displaying signs of accretion in X-ray, UV, optical spectra, and radio.

== Known sources ==
As of mid-2026, 15 LPTs have been confirmed. Three binary-system LPTs with orbital periods between 1.3 hours and 2.9 hours have been reported, along with 13 apparently isolated LPTs with periods from 7 minutes to 6.5 hours.

Known long-period radio transients
Source	Period	Discovery year	Facility	Notes
GCRT J1745−3009	77.01 min	2005	VLA	Probable precursor; Galactic Centre direction; classification debated
GLEAM-X J162759.5−523504.3	18.18 min	2022	MWA	Active for ~3 months; first modern LPT
GPM J1839−10	21.97 min	2023	MWA	Active since at least 1988; claimed 9-hour binary orbit
ASKAP J1935+2148	53.76 min	2024	ASKAP	Multiple emission states
ASKAP / DART J1832−0911	44.27 min	2024	ASKAP / DART	Periodic X-ray; no optical counterpart
ILT J1101+5521	125.53 min	2024	LOFAR	Confirmed binary; optical spectrum consistent with M-dwarf
GLEAM-X J0704−37	174.94 min	2024	MWA	Confirmed binary; optical spectrum consistent with M-dwarf
ASKAP J1839-0756	387.02 min	2025	ASKAP	Longest known period (~6.45 hr); exhibits weak interpulse emission at half-period
ASKAP J1448-6857	93.85 min	2025	ASKAP	Detected at X-ray wavelengths; no confirmed X-ray period
CHIME J0630+25	7.02 min	2025	CHIME	Timing glitches detected
CHIME / ILT J163430+445010	14.02 min	2025	LOFAR / CHIME	~100% circularly polarised; no optical counterpart
ASKAP J1755-2527	69.77 min	2024	ASKAP	Intermittent; discovered as a single pulse; switched back on months later
ASKAP J142431.2-612611	35.79 min	2026	ASKAP	Intermittent; only observed for a few weeks
ASKAP J1745-5051	80.68 min	2026	ASKAP	Confirmed binary; optical spectrum consistent with cataclysmic variable; periodic X-ray at orbital period. Distance disputed.
ASKAP J165130.3−450520	388.6 min	2026	ASKAP VASTER	no optical counterpart
ASKAP J170036.6−445758	281.6 min	2026	ASKAP VASTER	no optical counterpart

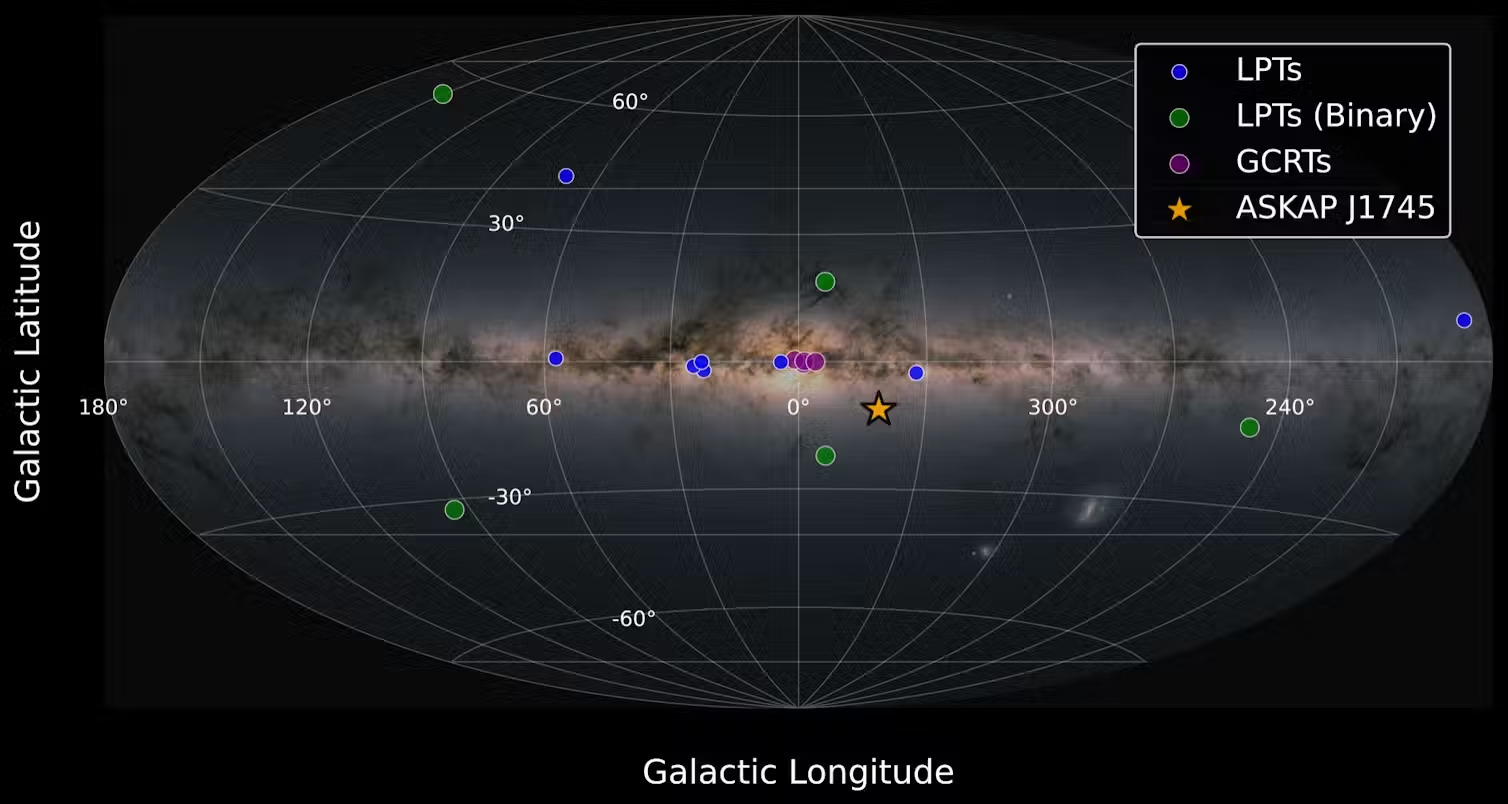
Map of LPTs, binary LPTs and galactic centre radio transients (GCRTs) as of June 2026

== Theoretical models ==
No single model has achieved consensus in explaining all observed LPTs. Several competing hypotheses are actively considered.

=== Ultra-slowly rotating magnetar ===
The most widely discussed model invokes a neutron star with an extremely strong magnetic field (a magnetar) that has spun down to rotation periods of minutes or more, possibly aided by fallback accretion from supernova ejecta shortly after birth. Magnetars are known to emit coherent, highly polarised radio pulses, and LPT characteristics — including mode switching and polarisation behaviour — qualitatively resemble magnetar phenomenology. However, most LPT periods place the sources in or beyond the classical pulsar "death valley" — the region of period-period derivative diagram|period–period-derivative (P–Ṗ) phase space where pair production in the magnetosphere should cease, shutting off coherent radio emission. Whether alternative magnetic field configurations (twisted or multipolar fields) can sustain emission across this boundary is an open theoretical question.

=== Magnetic white dwarf ===
Some LPTs may be rapidly rotating (on astronomical timescales) magnetic white dwarfs producing coherent radio emission via electron cyclotron maser instability or similar processes. Pulsating white dwarf systems are known to emit radio waves — AR Scorpii being a prominent example — and the period range of LPTs is physically plausible for white dwarf spins and/or orbits. This model naturally explains sources found in binaries, and is supported by multi-wavelength detections of optical counterparts that hint at white dwarf companions to M-dwarfs. To date there has not been a radio detection of an isolated white dwarf, making the pulsating white dwarf a somewhat speculative hypothesis.

=== White dwarf binary interaction ===
For a subset of LPTs now confirmed to be in binary systems (e.g., ILT J1101+5521, GLEAM-X J0704−37), the observed radio periodicity matches the orbital period rather than a spin period. In this framework, the white dwarf's magnetic field interacts with a companion star (typically an M-dwarf or ultracool dwarf), inducing coherent radio emission — analogous to Jupiter–Io magnetospheric interactions but on a stellar scale. GPM J1839−10, the longest-lived LPT, has itself been found to have a 9-hour binary orbit, linking it observationally to white dwarf pulsar systems.

ASKAP J1745-5051 has been found to exhibit radio and X-ray pulses at the spectroscopic period, with intermittency and frequency behaviour consistent with spin-orbit asynchronicity. It was the first LPT to confirm the white dwarf binary hypothesis, demonstrating that accreted material may play a role in driving the radio emission.

=== Other hypotheses ===
Additional theoretical proposals include precessing neutron star–black hole binaries producing apparent ultra-long periods through self-lensing, and hypothetical objects composed of strange quark matter ("strange dwarf pulsars"). These models remain speculative and lack direct observational support.

== Observational facilities ==
LPTs operate on timescales that fall in a historically under-explored gap between fast radio transients (milliseconds) and slow synchrotron variables (days to months). Their detection has been enabled by a new generation of wide-field radio interferometers capable of imaging at cadences of seconds to minutes:

- Murchison Widefield Array (MWA), Western Australia — site of the first modern LPT discoveries.
- Australian SKA Pathfinder (ASKAP) — Western Australia, enabled sensitive, wide-field surveys at gigahertz frequencies.
- Low-Frequency Array (LOFAR), Europe — has contributed discoveries at low radio frequencies, including high-declination sources.
- MeerKAT, South Africa — used for sensitive targeted follow-up and discovery.
- Canadian Hydrogen Intensity Mapping Experiment (CHIME) — contributed to finding LPTs with timing solutions, including a source exhibiting a timing glitch.

Multi-wavelength follow-up observations with X-ray telescopes (e.g., Swift, XMM-Newton, Chandra) and optical telescopes have been critical in identifying binary companions and constraining the physical nature of individual sources.

== Significance and open questions ==
Long-period radio transients challenge established models of neutron star evolution and pulsar emission. Their existence in the period–period-derivative diagram near or beyond the pulsar death valley suggests that either the death-line theories require revision, or that at least some LPTs belong to a fundamentally different class of object than rotation-powered neutron stars.

Key open questions include:

- What fraction of LPTs are neutron stars versus white dwarfs, or something else?
- How do LPTs maintain coherent emission at such long rotation periods?
- What is the relationship between apparently isolated LPTs and binary-system LPTs?
- Are Galactic Center Radio Transients (GCRTs) the same phenomenon as modern LPTs?
- How large is the total Galactic LPT population, and what are the selection biases of current surveys?

The rapid pace of discovery since 2022 suggests that the LPT population may be substantially larger than currently sampled. Future surveys with the Square Kilometre Array (SKA) and its precursors are expected to dramatically expand the known census.

== See also ==
- Pulsar
- Magnetar
- Fast radio burst
- White dwarf pulsar
- AR Scorpii
- GCRT J1745−3009
- GPM J1839−10
- ASKAP J1745-5051
- Rotating radio transient
- Transient astronomical event
