= Radio transient =

Radio transient could refer to:

In radio astronomy :

- Rotating radio transient
- Galactic Center radio transient
- Fast radio burst, milliseconds, most are one-offs, a few repeat
- pulsar, radio pulses from a rotating neutron star
- new phenomena such as GLEAM-X J162759.5−523504.3 (18 min period) reported in 2022.
