= Experiment to Detect the Global EoR Signature =

Experimental telescope in Australia

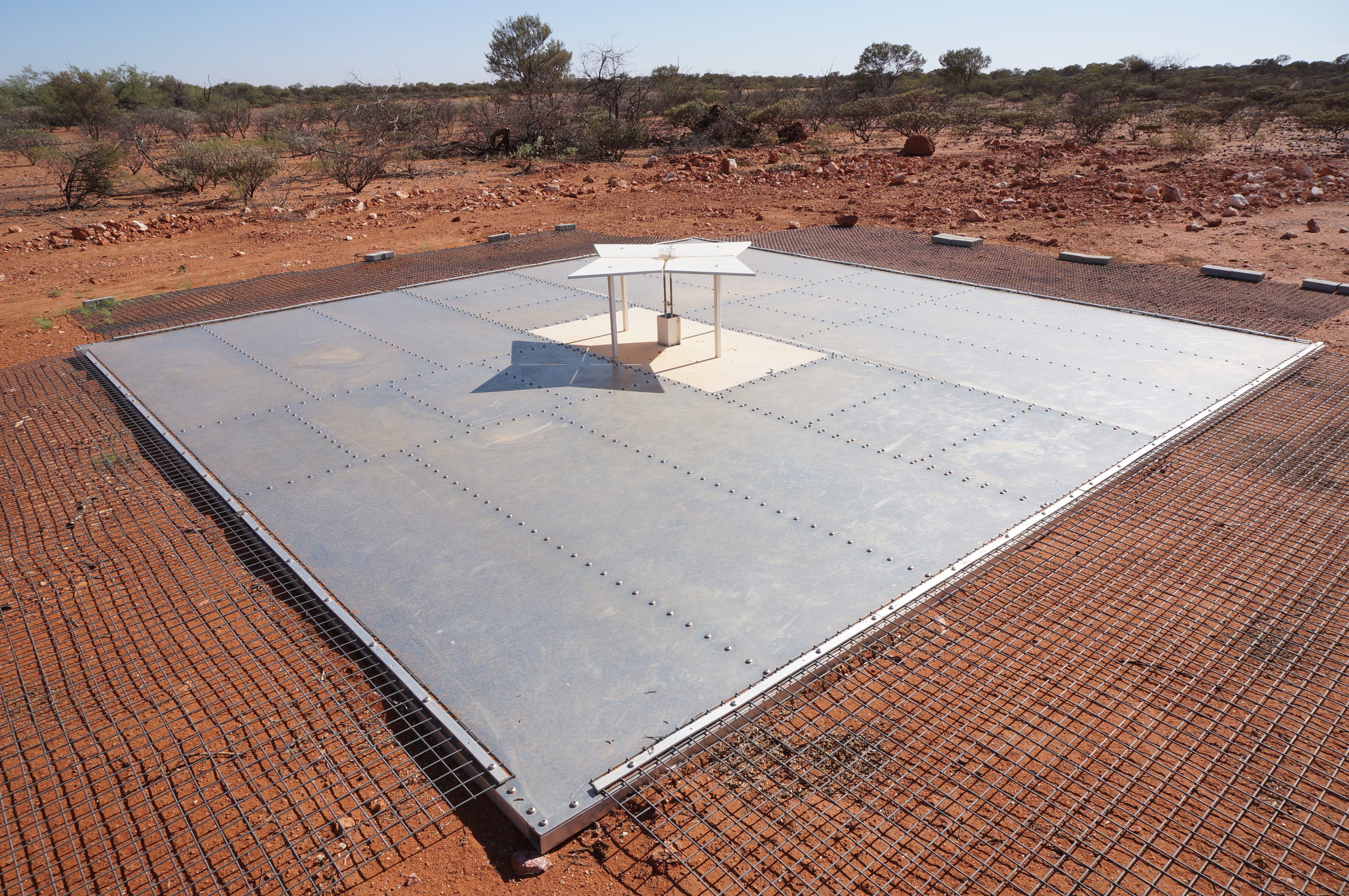
- Alternative names: EDGES
- Location(s): Western Australia, AUS
- Coordinates: 26°42′53″S 116°36′16″E
- Website: www.haystack.mit.edu/astronomy/astronomy-projects/edges-experiment-to-detect-the-global-eor-signature/
- Location of Experiment to Detect the Global EoR Signature
- Related media on Commons

The Experiment to Detect the Global EoR Signature (EDGES) is an experiment and radio telescope located in a radio quiet zone at the Murchison Radio-astronomy Observatory in Western Australia. It is a collaboration between Arizona State University and Haystack Observatory, with infrastructure provided by CSIRO. EoR stands for epoch of reionization, a time in cosmic history when neutral atomic hydrogen gas became ionised due to ultraviolet light from the first stars.

== Low-band instruments ==
The experiment has two low-band instruments, each of which has a dipole antenna pointed to the zenith and observing a single polarisation. The antenna is around 2 by 1 metre (6.6 ft × 3.3 ft) in size, sat on a 30 by 30 metres (98 ft × 98 ft) ground shield. It is coupled with a radio receiver, with a 100-metre (330 ft) cable run to a digital spectrometer. The instruments operate at 50–100 MHz (6.0–3.0 m), and are separated by 150 metres (490 ft). Observations started in August 2015.

In 2023, a new version of the low-band antenna in which the electronics are built into the antenna was installed on a larger ground plane of 50 by 50 metres (160 ft × 160 ft) to further reduce the effects of scattering from nearby objects and observations started in June 2023.

=== 78 MHz absorption profile ===
In March 2018, the collaboration published a paper in Nature announcing the discovery of a broad absorption profile centered at a frequency of $78\pm1$MHz in the sky-averaged signal after subtracting Galactic synchrotron emission. The absorption profile has a width of $19_{-2}^{+4}$MHz and an amplitude of $0.5_{-0.2}^{+0.5}$K, against a background RMS of 0.025K, giving it a signal-to-noise ratio of 37. The equivalent redshift is centered at $z\approx17$, spanning z=20–15. The signal is possibly due to ultraviolet light from the first stars in the Universe altering the emission of the 21cm line by lowering the temperature of the hydrogen relative to the cosmic microwave background (the mechanism is Wouthuysen–Field coupling). A "more exotic scenario," encouraged by the unexpected strength of the absorption, is that the signal is due to interactions between dark matter and baryons.

In 2021, Melia reported that the deeper absorption is compatible with the alternative Friedmann–Lemaître–Robertson–Walker (FLRW) cosmology known as the Rh = ct universe.

In 2022, an experiment called Shaped Antenna Measurement of the Background Radio Spectrum (SARAS) led by the Raman Research Institute reported that their measurements didn't replicate EDGES results rejecting them at 95.3% confidence level.

== High-band instruments ==
The high-band instrument is of similar design, and operates at 90–200 MHz (3.3–1.5 m).

== See also ==
- Large Aperture Experiment to Detect the Dark Ages (LEDA)
- Absolute Radiometer for Cosmology, Astrophysics, and Diffuse Emission (ARCADE)
- List of astronomical observatories
- List of astronomical societies
- List of radio telescopes
