= GCRT =

GCRT may refer to:

- Geneva Convention on Road Traffic, 1949 international treaty on road traffic rules
- G:link, formerly Gold Coast Rapid Transit, light rail system in Queensland, Australia
- Gender Centre for Research and Training, Sudanese organisation
- GCRT J1745−3009, a transient, bursting low-frequency radio source
