= ASKAP J1832−0911 =

Long period transient stellar object

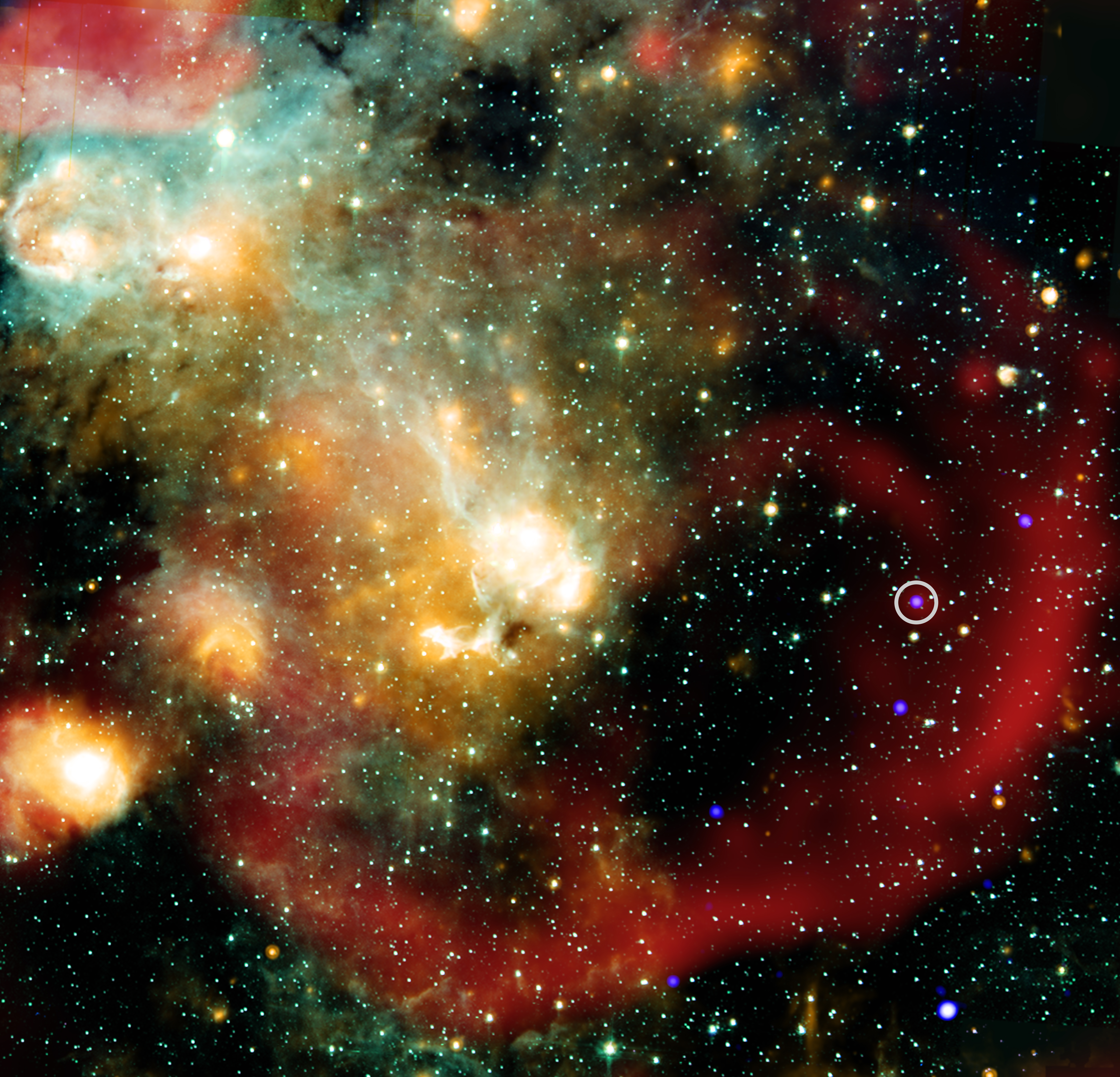
- A wide field image of ASKAP J1832 in X-ray, radio, and infrared light (circled). Credit: X-ray: NASA/CXC/ICRAR, Curtin Univ./Z. Wang et al.; Infrared: NASA/JPL/CalTech/IPAC; Radio: SARAO/MeerKAT; Image processing: NASA/CXC/SAO/N. Wolk

Observation data Epoch J2000 Equinox J2000
- Constellation: Scutum
- Right ascension: 18^{h} 32^{m} 48.4589^{s}
- Declination: −9° 11′ 15.297″

Characteristics
- Evolutionary stage: White dwarf or magnetar (suspected)

Astrometry

Details

Database references
SIMBAD	J1832-0911 data

ASKAP J1832-0911 is a stellar object referred to as an extremely bright "long period radio transient" (LPT). Its unusual properties are unlike those of any other known object. It has been hypothesized to be either an old magnetar or an ultra magnetized white dwarf, although discoverer Ziteng Wang says that "those theories do not fully explain what we are observing."

== Discovery ==
ASKAP J1832 was identified in May 2025 through observations taken at the Australian Square Kilometre Array Pathfinder, and was serendipitously discovered in the X-ray band when a coincident observation conducted through the Chandra X-ray Observatory targeting the supernova remnant SNR G22.7–0.2 was able to detect it.

== Properties ==
The body referred to as a long-period transient (LPT), ASKAP J1832 emits radio pulses and x-ray radiation approximately 2 minutes in duration every 44.2 minutes and is located within the Milky Way about 15,000 light-years away from Earth. There exists uncertainty of the object's stellar identity, with some believing it may be a magnetar or a white dwarf.

== See also ==
- Rotating radio transient
- Long Period Radio Transients
