= Eucalyptus sporadica =

Burngup mallee

Conservation status
- Vulnerable (IUCN 3.1)

Scientific classification
- Kingdom: Plantae
- Clade: Tracheophytes
- Clade: Angiosperms
- Clade: Eudicots
- Clade: Rosids
- Order: Myrtales
- Family: Myrtaceae
- Genus: Eucalyptus
- Species: E. sporadica

Binomial name
- Eucalyptus sporadica Brooker & Hopper
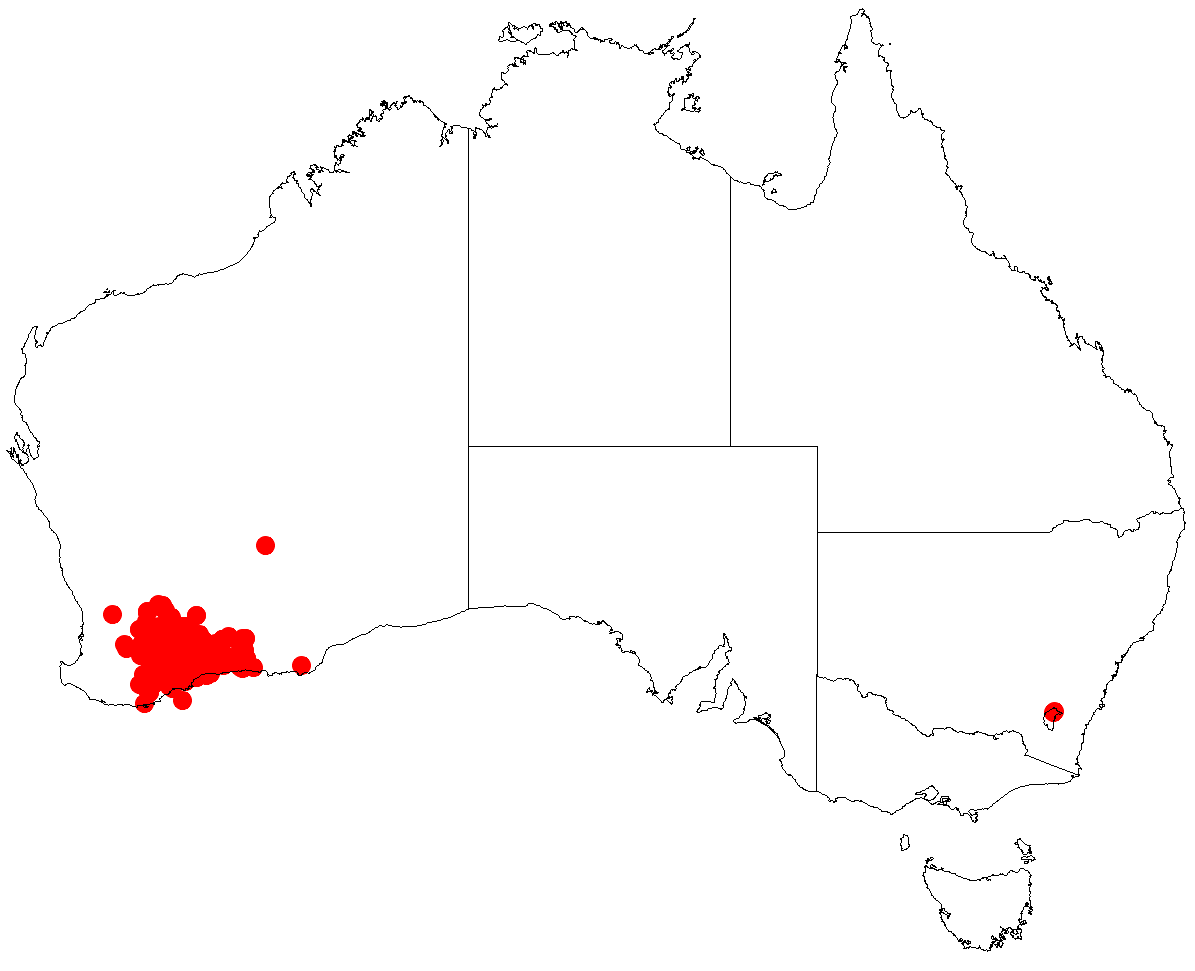
- Occurrence data from Australasian Virtual Herbarium

Species of eucalyptus

Eucalyptus sporadica, commonly known as the Burngup mallee, is a species of mallee that is endemic to the southwest of Western Australia. It has smooth bark, lance-shaped adult leaves, flower buds in groups of seven, yellowish flowers and down-turned, conical to cylindrical fruit.

== Description ==
Eucalyptus sporadica is a mallee that typically grows to a height of 4 m (13 ft) and forms a lignotuber. It has smooth, red-brown, grey, greenish grey or silvery white bark, occasionally with a short stocking of rough bark. Young plants and coppice regrowth have light green to bluish green, egg-shaped to lance-shaped or elliptical leaves that are 35–75 mm (1.4–3.0 in) long, 15–30 mm (0.59–1.18 in) wide and petiolate. Adult leaves are the same shade of glossy green on both sides, lance-shaped or curved, 50–100 mm (2.0–3.9 in) long and 8–18 mm (0.31–0.71 in) wide on a petiole 7–25 mm (0.28–0.98 in) long. The flowers are arranged in leaf axils on a downcurved, flattened peduncle 10–40 mm (0.39–1.57 in) long, the individual buds on pedicels 1–2 mm (0.039–0.079 in) long. Mature buds are an elongated, asymmetrical spindle shape, 13–28 mm (0.51–1.10 in) long and 3–7 mm (0.12–0.28 in) wide with a horn-shaped operculum that is two or three times as long as the floral cup. Flowering occurs from March or June to October or December and the flowers are lemon to greenish yellow. The fruit is a woody, downturned, conical to cylindrical capsule 6–15 mm (0.24–0.59 in) long and 7–10 mm (0.28–0.39 in) wide with the valves exserted.

== Taxonomy and naming ==
Eucalyptus sporadica was first formally described in 2002 by Ian Brooker and Stephen Hopper in the journal Nuytsia from specimens collected by Brooker near Burngup, south-east of Pingaring in 1984. The specific epithet (sporadica) is from the Latin word sporadicus meaning "sporadic", referring to the widespread but scattered distribution of the species.

== Distribution and habitat ==
Burngup mallee grows on sand, loam, clay soils and gravel and is found on granite outcrops, lateritic hills and breakaways. It is found between Peak Charles, Tarin Rock and the Fitzgerald River National Park in the Avon Wheatbelt, Coolgardie, Esperance Plains, Mallee and Murchison biogeographic regions.

== Conservation status ==
This mallee is classified as "not threatened" by the Western Australian Government Department of Parks and Wildlife. The IUCN Red List assesses the species as Vulnerable.

== See also ==
- List of Eucalyptus species
