= ASKAP J1745−5051 =

Star system in the constellation Ara

Observation data Epoch J2000 Equinox ICRS
- Constellation: Ara
- Right ascension: 17^{h} 45^{m} 08.929^{s}
- Declination: −50° 51′ 49.86″
Apparent magnitude (V)	19.7 (max)	

Characteristics
- Evolutionary stage: White dwarf + main sequence
- Spectral type: WD + M6.5±0.5
- Apparent magnitude (G): 19.45±0.04
- Variable type: AM Her

Astrometry
Parallax (π)	1.75±0.91 mas
Distance	approx. 1,900 ly (approx. 600 pc)

Orbit
Primary	White dwarf
Name	Red dwarf
Period (P)	1.368±0.053 h (82.08±3.18 min)
Semi-major axis (a)	0.61±0.05 R_{☉}
Inclination (i)	14±3°
Semi-amplitude (K_{1}) (primary)	114.2±7.5 km/s

Details

White dwarf
Mass	0.83±0.23 M_{☉}
Temperature	26,641±4,139 K

Red dwarf
Mass	0.0963±0.0047 M_{☉}
Radius	0.1321±0.0055 R_{☉}
Temperature	2,781±59 K

Other designations
- ASKAP J174508.9−505149

Database references
SIMBAD	data

ASKAP J1745−5051 (ASKAP J174508.9−505149) is a magnetic cataclysmic variable binary star in the constellation Ara with radio emission. It has been described as the first established as an accreting magnetic cataclysmic variable that shows characteristics similar to some Long Period Radio Transients. Its distance and component properties are uncertain.

== Discovery History ==
The object was first detected by the Australian Square Kilometre Array Pathfinder (Murchison Radio-astronomy Observatory), operated by the national science agency CSIRO. The search was conducted as part of the large-scale RACS-mid (Rapid ASKAP Continuum Survey) project at a frequency of 1.365 GHz. Among approximately 3 million registered radio sources, astronomers identified about 100 objects with anomalously high circular polarization of radiation, exceeding 10%. From this group of candidates, ASKAP J1745−5051 emerged as the only source not associated with any known astronomical object within a 10-arcsecond radius, but which exhibited bright, periodically repeating pulses over time intervals.

To refine the object's parameters, an international research team employed additional instruments. The South African radio interferometer MeerKAT and the Australian complex ATCA conducted long-term radio monitoring in the L, C, and X bands, which allowed for the precise localization of the source's position. The obtained coordinates were cross-referenced with archival databases, leading astronomers to discover a faint optical source in the Gaia space telescope catalog. Subsequently, the SOAR and Magellan ground-based optical telescopes in Chile performed spectroscopy of the object, revealing intense narrow emission lines of hydrogen and helium. This spectral configuration unequivocally indicated the presence of a close binary system with accreting matter around a highly magnetized compact object.

Later, the Chinese-European space satellite Einstein Probe (CAS/ESA) and NASA's Swift X-ray telescope conducted a monitoring session of the ASKAP J1745−5051 region. They detected hard X-ray and ultraviolet radiation, with the X-ray emission modulated on the same strictly fixed period of 1.368 hours. This spectroscopic period is consistent with the radio pulse period of 1.34497 hours. The X-ray emission confirmed the strong heating of the plasma during the accretion process, definitively ruling out the hypothesis of a slowly rotating single pulsar and proving that the source is a magnetic cataclysmic variable.

== System Characteristics ==
The discovery paper modelled the system as a magnetic white dwarf with a low-mass M-type donor, estimating a donor mass of 0.0963±0.0047 M_{☉}, radius of 0.1321±0.0055 R_{☉}, and effective temperature of 2,781±59 K. The binary has a spectroscopic orbital period of 1.368±0.053 hours, or about 82 minutes.

A later preprint by Knigge et al. reanalysed the far-ultraviolet to near-infrared spectral energy distribution, excluding photometry affected by a nearby contaminating star and fitting model-atmosphere spectra rather than blackbodies. This analysis found a cooler white dwarf, with a temperature of 15,000 K, and a sub-stellar donor mass of about 0.05 M_{☉} and a temperature around 1,800 K, at a distance of 320±70 pc. The authors argued that ASKAP J1745−5051 is likely a post-period-minimum, or "period bouncer", cataclysmic variable.

=== Radiation Generation ===
ASKAP J1745−5051 exhibits modulations of signals across the electromagnetic spectrum, with the radio and X-ray bursts peaking at different orbital phases, suggesting their generation in spatially separated regions of the binary system. This is supported by constraints on the electron density in the respective emission regions

The X-ray emission is consistent with accretion processes. However, because of the strong magnetic field of white dwarfs in these cataclysmic variables, the material stripped by the white dwarf's gravity from the red dwarf cannot form an accretion disk . Instead, the plasma is channeled along magnetic field lines, forming accretion streams. In the shock wave region, the plasma is heated to temperatures on the order of 10^{7} K, generating a high-energy X-ray flux.

The radio emission is produced by a different but related mechanism. Accreting streams of charged material accelerate towards the interaction region between magnetic fields of the white dwarf and the companion star. This possibly generates coherent radiation, detected on Earth as highly collimated radio beams. ASKAP J1745−5051 is claimed to be unusually radio luminous for a cataclysmic variable, although its inferred radio luminosity depends on the adopted distance.
