= Wooleen Station =

Pastoral lease in Western Australia

Coordinates: 27°5′12″S 116°9′45″E

Location in Western Australia

Wooleen Station is a pastoral lease that was previously operated as a sheep station and currently runs cattle. The station was established in 1886 in the Murchison region of Western Australia that is bisected by the Murchison River. The station is situated approximately 680 kilometres (423 mi) north of Perth in the Shire of Murchison.

The property lies just west of Boolardy Station, now the home of the Murchison Radio-astronomy Observatory, which incorporates the Square Kilometre Array (SKA).

== History ==
Wooleen was first selected in 1887, by James Sharpe and David McWhinney. In February 1890, a shepherd named Templeton and about 1,100 sheep died from dehydration in extremely hot weather. Templeton's body was found 50 miles (80 km) west of the homestead, along with a note describing his predicament. The district received good rains a few days later.

Heavy rains fell in the area in 1921 with the local mail being stranded at Wooleen for some time as a result of washaways, nearby properties recorded falls of up to 15 inches (38 cm). A 12-stand shearing shed was built in 1922.

Ben Sharpe who owned Wooleen Station also took up the lease at Mardie Station in 1923. Sharpe took delivery of a 15-hp Crossley, fitted with tray body to use as a station runabout, at Wooleen in 1924.

Over 28,000 sheep were shorn at the station in 1924.

By 1954 the property occupied an area of 460,000 acres (186,155 ha) and was carrying a flock of 30,000 sheep.

The Sharpe family later bought the lease back again and ran the station until 1984, when Christopher Sharpe, the last male member of the family died. Christopher's uncle, David Sharpe, and aunt, Sheila Sharpe (née Hancock, known as Peg), sister of Western Australian mining magnate Lang Hancock, ran the station from 1944 to 1956.

The property was taken over by the Pollock family, Helen and Brett, in 1990, who changed the focus of the property from raising livestock to a farm-stay business to strengthen its financial position. The couple welcomed their first customers in 1993. The station was taken over by son David and his partner Frances Jones in 2007. The couple have worked with the Mulloon Institute to make the property more ecologically sustainable. Their story was featured in the episode "Saving Wolleen" on Australian Story on ABC in 2012.

The heritage-listed homestead is 1,200 square metres (12,917 sq ft) with wide colonial style verandahs with a large billiards room and extensive library, it also has its own swimming pool.

== Description ==
The property covers a total area of 152,000 hectares (375,600 acres). The bulk of the land is mulga scrub land and contains a 36 kilometres (22 mi)-length of the Murchison and Roderick Rivers as well as Lake Wooleen. It is bordered to the north by Meeberrie, to the east by Boolardy and to the south by Murgoo Station.

Wooleen is operated under the Crown Lease number CL187-1970 and has the Land Act number LA3114/959.

As of 2020 the owners are looking at options for expanding the tourism potential of the station, as it is situated on land adjoining the Boolardy Station, now the home of the Murchison Radio-astronomy Observatory, which incorporates the Square Kilometre Array.

== See also ==
- List of ranches and stations
