= Large Aperture Experiment to Detect the Dark Ages =

Research project on the early universe

- Location: New Mexico
- Coordinates: 34°04′08″N 107°37′41″W
- Wavelength: 3.4 m (88 MHz)–10 m (30 MHz)
- Diameter: 500 m (1,640 ft 5 in)
- Collecting area: 3,000 m^{2} (32,000 sq ft)
- Website: www.tauceti.caltech.edu/leda/
- Location within the United States

The Large-Aperture Experiment to Detect the Dark Ages (LEDA) is designed to detect the spectrum of the 21 cm Hydrogen line from the Intergalactic Medium (IGM) at redshifts of 15–30, when the Universe was just ~1% of its present age. It is located at the Long Wavelength Array site, adjacent to the Very Large Array. LEDA principally comprises a "large-N" array correlator (512 inputs over ~ 60 MHz), calibration & imaging system, and instrumentation for measurement of calibrated total-power. These systems will use the station 1 of the Long Wavelength Array as an aperture. LEDA will feature array-based calibration to improve the accuracy of foreground subtraction from the total-power signal.

The project received funding from the National Science Foundation in August 2011. LEDA is one of several efforts seeking to study cosmological reionization and the preceding Dark Ages. Others include the Precision Array for Probing the Epoch of Reionization (PAPER), Low Frequency Array (LOFAR), Murchison Widefield Array (MWA), and Giant Metrewave Radio Telescope (GMRT).

== See also ==
- Experiment to Detect the Global EoR Signature (EDGES)
