= East Murchison, Western Australia =

East Murchison
- Town
- Interactive map of East Murchison
- Coordinates: 26°16′13″S 117°0′49″E
- Country: Australia
- State: Western Australia
- LGA: Shire of Murchison

Government
  - State electorate: North West
  - Federal division: Durack

Population
  - Total: 0 (2021)
- Postcode: 6640

East Murchison is a locality in the Mid West region of Western Australia. At the 2021 census, East Murchison recorded a population of 0.

== Demographics ==
As of the 2021 Australian census, no people resided in East Murchison, down from 11 in the 2016 census. At the 2016 census, the median age of persons in East Murchison was 44 years. There were fewer males than females, with 33.3% of the population male and 66.7% female. The average household size was 0 people per household.
