= Cleo Loi =

Australian astrophysicist

- Born: 1991 or 1992 (age 34–35)
- Education: University of Sydney
- Known for: Mapping plasma tubes in the Earth's atmosphere
- Awards: Bok Prize of the Astronomical Society of Australia (2015)
- Scientific career
- Fields: Astrophysics
- Workplaces: CAASTRO ARC Centre of Excellence for All-Sky Astrophysics

Shyeh Tjing Cleo Loi (born c. 1991) is an Australian astrophysicist and PhD candidate in the Department of Applied Mathematics and Theoretical Physics at the University of Cambridge under John Papaloizou, having completed her undergraduate studies at the University of Sydney School of Physics in 2014. She is credited with proving the existence of plasma tubes inside the Earth's magnetosphere and extending into the plasmasphere.

== Background ==
Loi had been a student at James Ruse Agricultural High School before studying at the University of Sydney as an undergraduate and member of the ARC Centre of Excellence for All-Sky Astrophysics (CAASTRO).

== Plasma tubes ==
While working on her undergraduate thesis, Loi followed the suspicions of scientists as far back as 60 years ago theorizing the existence of plasma tubes. Loi was the lead researcher on the project, and first to successfully prove their existence using the Murchison Widefield Array. The findings of the study were published in the Geophysical Research Letters.

In June 2015, Tara Murphy of the University of Sydney explained the process by which her undergraduate student, Loi, had used MWA results to determine the existence of plasma channels following the Earth's magnetic field lines. Loi applied visualization techniques to specific data that showed distortions in positions for distant point sources, explaining the distortion by the existence of tubular structures along the field lines. Dividing the MWA data into a 'stereo' set from several MWA sources allowed the height of the tubes to be determined. They are believed to be, or are related to, "whistler ducts".

== Honors and prizes ==
Loi won the Astronomical Society of Australia and Australian Academy of Science's 2015 Bok Prize for her plasma tube research. Loi was a finalist of the Young Australian of the Year 2017.

== Music ==
Cleo Loi is an accomplished violinist, violist, recorder player, and répétiteur active in the Cambridge University music scene.

She gained recognition as Assistant Musical Director for Trial By Jury (2018) with the Cambridge University Gilbert and Sullivan Society, collaborating with conductor Robert Nicholas and director Tiffany Charnley.

Loi has performed extensively with Cambridge University musical societies:

- The Gondoliers (2016) - Violin II, Cambridge University Gilbert & Sullivan Society
- Iolanthe (2018) - Assistant Musical Director, Piano
- Cambridge University Recorder Ensemble (2018-19) - Publicity Officer
