= Lake Wooleen =

Lake in Western Australia

- Location in Western Australia
- Interactive map of Lake Wooleen
- Location: Western Australia
- Coordinates: 27°4′24″S 116°11′4″E
- Type: Intermittent freshwater lake
- Basin countries: Australia
- Max. length: 27 km (17 mi)
- Max. width: 3 km (1.9 mi)
- Surface area: 5,500 hectares (13,591 acres)

Lake Wooleen is a DIWA-listed intermittent freshwater lake system in the Mid West region of Western Australia. The lake is situated on Wooleen Station, approximately 148 kilometres (92 mi) north of Yalgoo and 176 kilometres (109 mi) west of Cue.

== Description ==
The 5,500-hectare (14,000-acre) lake is situated on the Yilgarn craton, lying on alluvial and lacrustine valley-fill deposits in the flood plain of the Roderick River. The surrounding country gently undulates among isolated hills and rocky outcrops. Wooleen is a flood plain lake made up of two claypans joined by a neck including associated marches.

The lake receives water approximately once every four years, fills once every ten years, and floods once every thirty years. It results from its position on a fault line and when it overflows it discharges into the Murchison River, but when the Murchison is in flood it can flow into the lake.

Filling is usually the result of rain events of a tropical origin that occur in autumn and summer; water depth may reach as high as several metres when full and can take as long as ten months to dry out again. The water quality is fresh when full but becomes increasingly brackish as the lake dries out.

The vegetation in the lakebed and claypans is mostly shrubland with species such as samphire and lignum dominating, and low open woodland of Eucalyptus camaldulensis in the margins. The surrounding vegetation is taller open shrubland.

== See also ==
- List of lakes of Australia § Western Australia
