= Bok Prize =

Australian award for student research in astronomy

- Description: Annual astronomy award presented to a student at an Australian university for outstanding research
- Country: Australia
- Presented by: Astronomical Society of Australia and the Australian Academy of Science

The Bok Prize is awarded annually by the Astronomical Society of Australia and the Australian Academy of Science to recognise outstanding research in astronomy by honoring a student at an Australian university. The prize consists of the Bok Medal together with an award of $1000 and ASA membership for the following year.

== History ==
The prize is named to commemorate the energetic work of Bart Bok in promoting the undergraduate and graduate study of astronomy in Australia, during his term (1957–1966) as Director of the Mount Stromlo Observatory.

== Past winners ==
Source: Astronomical Society of Australia

Year	Winner	University	Awarded for
2025	Li Yusen	Australian National University	Orbital dynamics in barred Milky Way
2024	Sophie Young	University of Tasmania	Free-free Absorption in Young Radio Galaxies
2023	William McDonald	The University of Western Australia	Dissociation of Dark Matter and Gas in Cosmic Large-scale Structure
2022	Maria Djuric	University of Sydney	It looks like the Milky Way is a giant Swiss roll
2021	Madeleine McKenzie	The University of Western Australia	Simulating the Formation of Multiple Stellar Populations in Globular Clusters
2020	James Beattie	Australian National University Research School of Astronomy & Astrophysics (RSAA)	Supersonic Turbulent Molecular Clouds: Filaments and Anisotropies
2019	Sam Cree	University of Queensland	Can the fluctuations of the Quantum Vacuum Solve the Cosmological Constant Problem?
2018	Matthew Keen	University of Sydney	Asteroseismology of Subgiant Stars: A Study of Mixed-Mode Oscillations
2017	Madeline Marshall	University of Tasmania	Triggering Active Galactic Nuclei in Galaxy Clusters
2016	Samuel Hinton	University of Queensland	Extraction of Cosmological Information from WiggleZ
2015	Cleo Loi	University of Sydney	Waves in the sky: Probing the ionosphere with the Murchison Widefield Array
2014	Ross Turner	University of Tasmania	Evolution of radio-loud Active Galactic Nuclei
2013	Ben Pope	University of Sydney	Dancing in the Dark: Kernel Phase Interferometry of Ultracool Dwarfs
2012	Alison Hammond	University of Sydney	Cosmic Magnetism: Faraday Rotation as a Probe of Extragalactic Magnetic Fields
2011	Barnaby Norris	University of Sydney	A study of AGB circumstellar dust shells using optical polarimetric interferometry
2010	Madusha Gunawardhana	Macquarie University/AAO	Constraints on the Evolution of the Stellar Initial Mass Function
2009	Peter Jensen	University of Queensland	The Colours of Galaxies in Intermediate X-ray Luminosity Galaxy Clusters
2008	Christopher Hales	University of Sydney	Cosmic Forensics: A study of the Pulsar Wind Nebula G359.1-23, The Mouse
2007	Katie Dodds-Eden	Australian National University Research School of Astronomy & Astrophysics (RSAA)	TeVeS Theory and observational tests.
2006	Brent Miszalski	Macquarie University	Simulated Annealing and Optimisation of 2dF Fibre Configuration
2005	Patrick Scott	Australian National University	CO spectral line formation in the sun: convective simulation, line profiles and isotopic abundances
2004	Stanislav Shabala	University of Tasmania	On the Evolution of HII regions
2003	Darren Croton	Australian National University Research School of Astronomy & Astrophysics (RSAA)	Clustering and void statistics of the 2dF galaxy redshift survey
2002	not awarded		
2001	Yeshe Fenner	Australian National University	Solving the Mystery of the Warm Ionised Medium
2000	Josephine Brown	Australian National University	A photometric morphological and environmental study of the COLA galaxy southern sample
1999	Michael Murphy	University of New South Wales	Variability of the Fine Structure Constant
1998	Malcolm Kennett	University of Sydney	Neutrino Emission from a Magnetised Plasma
1997	Jean-Pierre Macquart	University of Sydney	Radio Propagation through Discrete Structures in the Interstellar Medium
1996	Lisa Kewley	University of Adelaide	Astrophysical Angular Correlations
1995	Michael Brown	University of Melbourne	A study of compound chondrule formation in meteorites
1994	Arthur Street	University of Sydney	Work on acceleration in type II solar radio bursts
1993	Sally Houghton	University of New South Wales	A study of methanol masers towards Sagittarius B2
1992	Kylie Waring	Monash University	Photometry of stellar variations
1991	Neal Turner	University of Sydney	Work on the atmospheres of cool dwarf stars
1990	Robert Reinfrank	University of Wollongong	A CCD survey of bright southern galaxies
1989	Andrew Gray	University of Sydney	Solar observations using the Molonglo radio telescope

== See also ==
- List of astronomy awards
- Prizes named after people
