= Boolardy =

Former pastoral lease in Western Australia

- Location within Western Australia

General information
- Type: Station
- Location: 194 km (121 mi) north-north-east of Pindar, Western Australia
- Coordinates: 26°59′01″S 116°32′48″E

Western Australia Heritage Register
- Official name: Boolardy Homestead Group
- Designated: 29 May 2001
- Reference no.: 1698

Boolardy Station is a remote former sheep and cattle station in the Mid West (Murchison) region of Western Australia, about 194 km (121 mi) north-north-east of Pindar and 200 km (120 mi) west-south-west of Meekatharra. It is within the Shire of Murchison and situated on pastoral lease no. 3114/406 (Crown lease 146/1966). The area of the lease is 3,467.48 square kilometres (1,338.80 sq mi).

In 2009 the CSIRO (Commonwealth Scientific and Industrial Research Organisation) purchased the property for A$5.42 million, to provide the location of the Murchison Radio-astronomy Observatory, while the owners continued running the property as a cattle station until around 2014.

== Description ==
An area of 266 square kilometres (103 sq mi) within the station was composed of reserves and Crown land. In 2011 a report stated that the soil had a low level of erosion, with 87% of the land being described as nil or minor. The perennial vegetation condition was fair, with 39% of vegetation cover being described as poor or very poor.

The property was an important pastoral property in the Murchison region, with the Boolardy Homestead used as offices of the Murchison Road Board for many years.

The station's western boundary is bordered by Wooleen Station.

The various stone buildings of Boolardy Station were classified by the National Trust of Western Australia on 2 September 1985.

== History ==
Robert Austin and Kenneth Brown explored the region in 1854, noting the rich grassy plains of Boolardy and importantly, the Ngatta water hole. However, the potential of the area was not appreciated until 1873 when John Perks and Edward Wittenoom explored the area north of the water hole while searching for sheep grazing country. The water hole is about 10 kilometres (6.2 mi) south of the main homestead.

Perks and Wittenoom subsequently took up the initial lease and the first cattle and sheep were taken overland to Nookawarra in 1876, but as the site lacked suitable feed for horses, they moved to the Boolardy site. The lease was later associated with various members of the pioneering Wittenoom and Lefroy families, particularly Edward and Frank Wittenoom and Langlois Lefroy.

Aboriginal labour was extensively employed on Boolardy. In 1896, management of the station was brought into disrepute following the untimely death of an Aboriginal worker on the station, leading to the prosecution of the manager, George Thompson, and two other men, Ernest Waugh, and William Purtell, for manslaughter. In uncontested evidence, the dead man, named Wayinga, known as Micky or Mickey, was shown to have been chained by the neck to verandah posts overnight and then flogged in turn by Thompson and Waugh (Purtell not being involved). He died five days later. The first jury failed to reach a verdict on the charge. A second jury found the men not guilty, a verdict greeted with satisfaction in the town of Geraldton, where the trial was held.

By 1912 the station expected to shear 25,000 sheep using 16 stands in the shearing shed.

The station has consistently produced quality wool attracting high prices, at a wool sale in Perth in 1927 a small star lot of super combing sold from the station was sold for 28½d per pound, the most expensive at the sale.

The station was flooded in 1945 when 8 inches (203 mm) of rain fell in 24 hours, with over 100 miles (161 km) of fencing being washed away.

When the Murchison River and Gascoyne River catchments were inundated severe floods occurred in 2010, parts of Boolardy were submerged and the State Emergency Service despatched a helicopter to check on the welfare of those stranded at the station.

Little rain fell at Boolardy over 2012 and early 2013 resulting in dust storms and little green feed being available for stock. The owners, Mark and Carolyn Halleen, left the area between 2013 and 2015.

== Murchison Radio-astronomy Observatory ==
In 2009 the CSIRO purchased the property for A$5.42 million to provide the location of the Murchison Radio-astronomy Observatory, while the owners continued running the property as a cattle station for some time. Two large radio telescope projects on the Boolardy site, the Murchison Widefield Array and the Australian Square Kilometre Array Pathfinder, are precursors to the dual-sited Square Kilometre Array, with the other two sites being situated in the Karoo area of the Northern Cape Province in South Africa.

== See also ==
- List of homesteads in Western Australia
- List of ranches and stations
