= RRAT J1819-1458 =

Rotating radio transient

RRAT J1819-1458 is a Milky Way neutron star and the best studied of the class of rotating radio transients (RRATs) first discovered in 2006.

== General characteristics ==
RRAT J1819-1458 exhibits sporadic pulses of radio emission. It has a rotation period of 4.26 seconds and a slow-down rate which implies it has a dipole magnetic field strength higher than all other RRATs. In fact its magnetic field is stronger than the quantum critical limit. Its pulses are the brightest of all the RRATs and of the original 11 sources it has the highest burst rate.

The pulsar has three emission phases in one period, and most intense pulses are from the middle phase. Many pulses are observed 'double-peaked' which are mostly in the middle emission phase. The pulse intensity distribution is reported similar to some normal pulsars and 'giant pulse' pulsars suggesting similar emission mechanisms.

X-ray extended emission around RRAT J1819−1458 is found, which can be interpreted with a nebula somehow powered by the pulsar. There is a possible candidate counterpart for RRAT J1819−1458.

It has been observed at X-ray wavelengths in observations using the Chandra X-ray Observatory and XMM Newton X-ray telescopes where an X-ray spectrum typical of thermal emission from a cooling neutron was observed. Modulation of the X-ray light at the 4.26 second rotation period is also observed indicating that there are hot spots on the surface of the star, i.e. the temperature distribution is not uniform.

RRAT J1819-1458 has been monitored since its discovery and has been observed to exhibit glitches, a rotational irregularity seen in many young pulsars and magnetars.

== See also ==
- Soft gamma repeater
- Anomalous X-ray pulsar
- Accretion-powered pulsar
