= GPM J1839−10 =

Neutron star in the constellation Scutum

GPM J1839−10 is a potentially unique ultra-long period magnetar located about 15,000 light-years away from Earth in the constellation Scutum, in the Milky Way. It was discovered by a team of scientists at Curtin University using the Murchison Widefield Array. Its unusual characteristics violate current theory and prompted a search of other radio telescope archives, including the Giant Metrewave Radio Telescope and the Very Large Array, which revealed evidence of the object dating back to 1988. The signature of the object went unnoticed because scientists did not know to look for its unusual behavior.

The current understanding of neutron stars is that below a certain rate of rotation, called "the death line", they cease emissions. Uniquely, not only does GPM J1839−10 have an extremely slow rotation of approximately twenty-two minutes, it emits bursts of radio waves lasting up to five minutes, for which there is currently no generally accepted explanation.

== See also ==
- GLEAM-X J162759.5−523504.3
- GCRT J1745−3009
- PSR J0901–4046
