= Radio spectrum pollution =

Deviation of radio waves beyond allocations

Radio waves hazard symbol

Radio spectrum pollution is the straying of electromagnetic waves in the radio spectrum (3 kHz to 300 GHz) outside their allocations that cause unintended effects on communication or health. It has three main categories, natural noise, leakage from devices not intended for radio transmissions, such as some light fixtures, and interference from radio transmissions. It is of particular concern in radio astronomy, aviation, and other fields, as well as for potential environmental effects.

Radio spectrum pollution is mitigated by effective spectrum management. Within the United States, the Communications Act of 1934 grants authority for spectrum management to the President for all federal use (47 U.S.C. 305). The National Telecommunications and Information Administration (NTIA) manages the spectrum for the Federal Government. Its rules are found in the "NTIA Manual of Regulations and Procedures for Federal Radio Frequency Management". The Federal Communications Commission (FCC) manages and regulates all domestic non-federal spectrum use (47 U.S.C. 301). Each country typically has its own spectrum regulatory organization. Internationally, the International Telecommunication Union (ITU) coordinates spectrum policy.

US frequency allocations, used to prevent radio pollution

In the early days of radio, no frequency allocation was allocated. As a result, there was a delay in receiving the distress signal of the Titanic, and its public sinking prompted the Radio Act of 1912. There are various natural and artificial sources of radio pollution. Among the natural sources are lightning strikes, which produce VHF (very high frequency) emissions. Atmospheric gases also produce radio pollution, as well as there being cosmic radio pollution from sources such as the cosmic microwave background. Artificially, there are stray transmissions. Even if all sources are removed, the antenna itself still provides some interference.

The ratio of noise to signal is often used in quantifying radio pollution. In absolute terms, nanowatts per square centimeter (nW/cm^{2}) are used to quantify the energy of all radio signals at a location. Research has found a typical 10-1000 nW/cm^{2} exposure to radio in most cellular frequencies. This is most often around 0.9 and 1.8 GHz. However, the exposure at particular places can vary greatly, from a negligible 0.67*10^-8 nW/cm^{2} in some rural areas to around 10,000 nW/cm^{2} in some urban centers.

Below 2 GHz, radio signals can be affected by cosmic sources. This is most relevant for communication with satellites, as the Sun and a few other sources such as Cassiopeia A give off strong radio signals, which can make contacting satellites overlapping them from an Earth-based view more difficult. Additionally, while radio quiet zones have been established for radio astronomy, satellites such as Starlink which are not covered by current regulations can provide interference.

Studies have been conducted on radio waves' impact on life. The most prominent influence is dielectric heating. In particular, high frequencies (above 6 GHz), showed greater effects. It has been widely acknowledged that there is limited research in this area, and the health effects in humans are more controversial, but the World Health Organization has listed it as possibly carcinogenic.

There are a few ethical issues surrounding radio spectrum pollution. Most regulatory agencies such as the FCC consider radio spectrum transmissions only to be potentially hazardous at high levels, which are not reached even near transmission towers. There also is the issue of regulation, in that some out-of-spectrum signals, especially from home devices, are often not considered large enough to enforce. Pirate radio is also an issue in many countries, and was at high levels in the 2010s in the United States, especially due to a decrease in FCC employee numbers. which prompted the 2020 Preventing Illegal Radio Abuse Through Enforcement (PIRATE) Act, giving the FCC increased enforcement capabilities.

== See also ==
- Electromagnetic radiation and health
- Frequency allocation
- Radio quiet zone
- Spectrum management
- Electromagnetic interference
