= Radio quiet zone =

Area where radio transmissions are restricted to prevent interference

A map showing the extent of the United States National Radio Quiet Zone.

A radio quiet zone is an area where radio transmissions are restricted in order to protect a radio telescope or a communications station from radio frequency interference. The Radio Regulations of the International Telecommunication Union (ITU) define interference as being detrimental to radio astronomy if it increases measurement uncertainty by 10%. In particular, the applicable regulation is known as ITU-R Recommendation RA.769, "Protection criteria used for radio astronomical measurements". Equipment that can cause interference includes mobile phones, television transmitters, and CB radios, as well as other electrical equipment.

Quiet zones are located in areas that are sparsely populated, and may be enforced based on government legislation. A radio quiet zone is often divided into two zones: an exclusion zone where all radio emissions are prohibited, and a larger coordination zone of up to 100 km^{2} where the power levels of radio transmissions are suitably limited so as not to interfere with the radio telescope.

Formal radio quiet zones exist around many observatories, including the Murchison Radio-astronomy Observatory in Australia, the Green Bank Observatory and the Sugar Grove Station in West Virginia, United States (the United States National Radio Quiet Zone), the Itapetinga Radio Observatory in Brazil,, FAST in Guizhou, China, and MeerKAT in South Africa as examples.

The ITU has recommended designating two locations in outer space as radio quiet zones: the shielded zone on the Moon's far side, and the Sun-Earth Lagrangian point L_{2}.

== See also ==
- List of established military terms
- Dark (broadcasting)
- Dead air
- Mapimí Silent Zone
- Pine Gap
- Radio silence
- Radio spectrum pollution
- United States National Radio Quiet Zone
