= GLEAM-X J162759.5−523504.3 =

Transient astronomical radio source

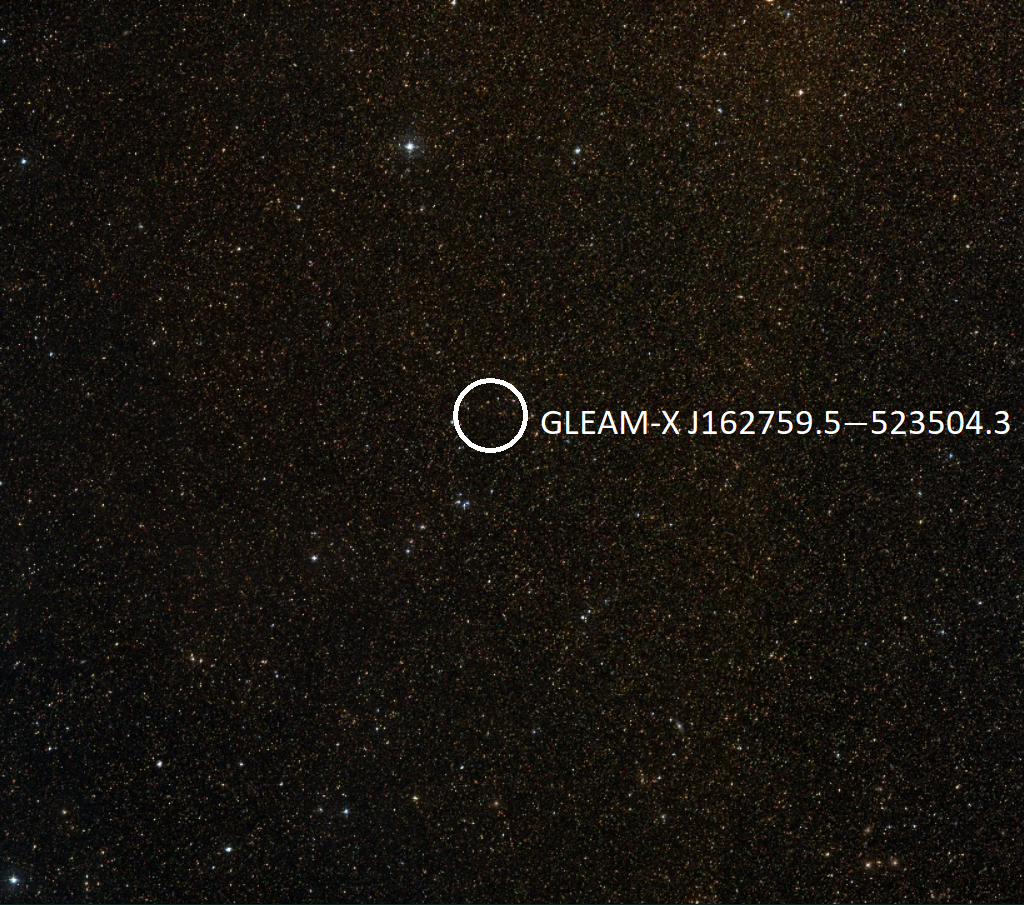
- GLEAM-X J162759.5−523504

Observation data Epoch J2000.0 Equinox J2000.0
- Constellation: Norma
- Right ascension: 16^{h} 27^{m} 59.50^{s}
- Declination: −52° 35′ 04.3″

Database references
SIMBAD	data

GLEAM-X J162759.5−523504.3 is a transient astronomical radio source, found in 2020, in archival data recorded in 2018 by the GLEAM survey of the Murchison Widefield Array.

The source was active in radio for about 1 minute every 18 minutes, from January to March 2018, but has not been recorded since.

== Nature of source ==
It seems somewhat like a Galactic Center radio transient (GCRT) except it is thought to be only about 4,000 light-years (1,200 pc) distant.

The radio emissions were polarised (as if affected by a magnetic field) so it may be a predicted astrophysical object called an "ultra-long period magnetar".

== See also ==
- GPM J1839−10
- GCRT J1745−3009
- PSR J0901–4046
- Rotating radio transient
- Long Period Radio Transients
