= Murchison Radio-astronomy Observatory =

Radio-astronomy observatory in Western Australia

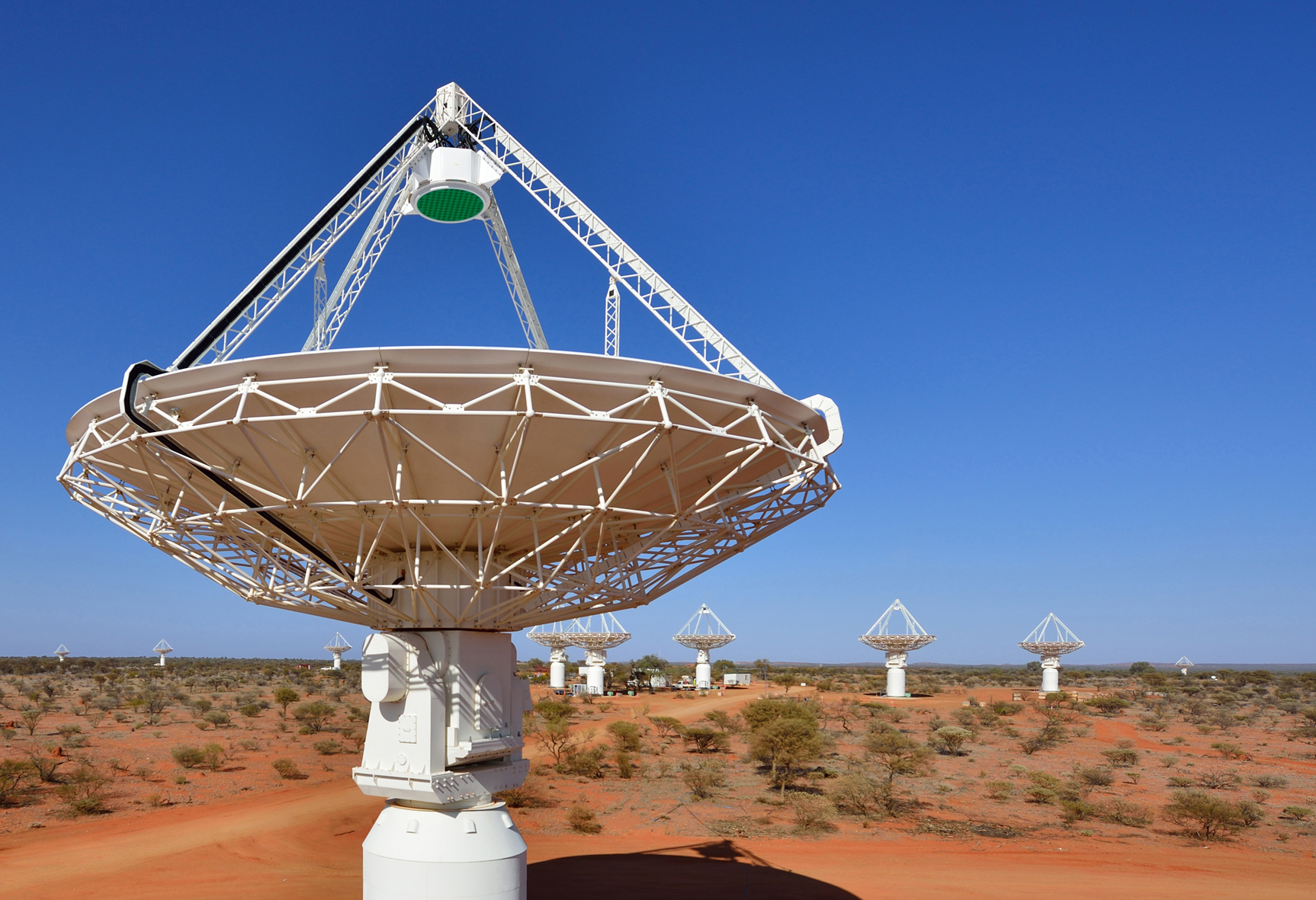
- Close up of an ASKAP antenna with several more in the background
- Alternative names: MRO
- Location: Boolardy, Western Australia, AUS
- Coordinates: 26°42′11″S 116°40′14″E
- Established: 2009
- Telescopes: Australian Square Kilometre Array Pathfinder; Experiment to Detect the Global EoR Signature; Murchison Widefield Array
- Related media on Commons

Inyarrimanha Ilgari Bundara, the CSIRO Murchison Radio-astronomy Observatory was established by CSIRO, Australia's national science centre in 2009. It lies in a designated radio quiet zone located near Boolardy Station in the Murchison Shire of Western Australia, about 800 kilometres (500 mi) north of Perth on the traditional lands of the Wajarri people.

It is one of two core sites for the international Square Kilometre Array (SKA) project, the other being located in South Africa. As part of this project, there have been two technology and science pathfinders, both established by 2012:

- the radio telescopes known as the Murchison Widefield Array (MWA), a low-frequency array operating in the frequency range 80–300 MHz
- the Australian Square Kilometre Array Pathfinder (ASKAP)

Construction on the main large SKA-Low telescope started in December 2022.

Several smaller experiments (CORE, EDGES, PAPER and SCOPE), unrelated to the SKA project, are also sited at the observatory.

== History ==
=== Radio quiet zone (2005) ===
The observatory was designated a protected radio quiet zone by the Australian Communications and Media Authority in April 2005, and in July 2011, an enhanced radio-quiet zone was imposed. The initial radio-quiet zone (renamed to the "inner zone") was a protected zone in a 70-kilometre (43 mi) radius around the observatory, in which all radio apparatus licences needed to be made with the approval of the observatory's governing body. The enhanced radio-quiet zone adds a second zone, effectively extending the license approval governing area from a radius of 70 kilometres (43 mi) to 150 kilometres (93 mi). As of December 2020, the outer "coordination" zone extends for a radius of 260 kilometres (160 mi). Within the radio quiet zone, there are restrictions on all radio communications equipment, including television transmitters, mobile phones, CB radios, and other devices, so as not to interfere with radio telescopes.

As of 2020, the CSIRO and the shire council have been investigating and discussing various internet connectivity possibilities with the shire, such as a small mobile network, or the use of optical fibre.

=== Observatory created (2009) ===
The CSIRO purchased the 340,000-hectare (840,000-acre) Boolardy Station for A$5.42 million in 2009, then a working cattle station. Then called the Murchison Radio-Astronomy Observatory, it was founded by the CSIRO in 2009, near Boolardy, a former cattle station in Western Australia.

By 2012, it comprised the Murchison Widefield Array (MWA) and the ASKAP radio telescope.

=== Observatory expanded (2022) ===
In 2022, the observatory was expanded to become Inyarrimanha Ilgari Bundara, the CSIRO Murchison Radio-astronomy Observatory – now 27 times bigger than the initial Murchison Radio-astronomy Observatory – to accommodate the SKA-Low telescope.

== Land use issues ==
=== Indigenous Land Use Agreement ===
CSIRO and the Australian Government have been working with the Wajarri Yamatji people to enable the projects to proceed while respecting the cultural needs of the traditional owners of the land, and also to deliver some benefits to them, in particular the tiny and remote Pia Wajarri Aboriginal community, next to Boolardy Station. For several years leading up to 2020, negotiations have been taking place ahead of the signing of an Indigenous land use agreement between the Wajarri people and the CSIRO, guided by the federal Department of Industry, Innovation and Science (now the Department of Industry, Science, Energy and Resources).

About 15 traditional owners are involved in the negotiations, representing different groups within the Wajarri. There are challenges involved in working out how to respect the cultural significance of the area, and how to build the infrastructure with minimal disruption to the landscape. Surveys of heritage sites have been undertaken, but the work and negotiations were somewhat disrupted by the COVID-19 pandemic. The Wajarri people are able to move freely across the land, so long as they respect the radio silence.

=== Tourism ===
With the Boolardy Station no longer in use as a cattle station since the owners left the region around 2014, the loss of seasonal work in cattle mustering, as well reduced pest control and reduction in community activities, has been felt by the people living in the area. The neighbouring Wooleen Station has facilities for guests, and the owners are working with local governments to develop its tourism potential. An interpretive centre situated 100 km (62 mi) from the observatory, at the Murchison Settlement, is one idea under consideration.

== Telescopes ==
=== Australian SKA Pathfinder (ASKAP) ===
The Australian Square Kilometre Array Pathfinder (ASKAP) was built by CSIRO and comprises 36 identical antennas, each 12 metres (39 ft) in diameter, working together as a single instrument. ASKAP's combination of fast survey speed and high sensitivity will allow astronomers to answer some fundamental questions about the creation and early evolution of the universe, and to test theories of cosmic magnetism and predictions from Albert Einstein's general theory of relativity. The facility was formally opened on 5 October 2012.

=== Murchison Widefield Array (MWA) ===
The Murchison Widefield Array (MWA) is a joint project between an international consortium of universities to build a low-frequency radio array operating in the frequency range 80–300 MHz. The main scientific goals of the MWA are to detect neutral atomic hydrogen emission from the cosmological epoch of reionization (EoR), to study the Sun, the heliosphere, the Earth's ionosphere, and to study radio transient phenomena. The MWA is the first so-called large-N array, fully cross-correlating signals from 128 phased tiles of 16 crossed dipoles (each). The field of view is large by the standard of astronomical instruments, being on the order of 30 degrees across.

=== Square Kilometre Array (SKA) ===
The Square Kilometre Array, commonly referred to as SKA, the SKA Project or SKA Programme, is a radio telescope project undertaken by an international working group, beginning in September 1993. In 2012 it was decided that two sites would be used for the telescopes, one at the Murchison site in Australia and the other in South Africa, while the organisation's headquarters would be located in the UK. The Murchison Widefield Array (MWA) and the Australian SKA Pathfinder (ASKAP) are seen as precursors to the main SKA telescope, with both of these (along with the South African MeerKAT and HERA telescopes) providing useful scientific information while at the same time aiding in assisting the final design, development and testing of the main SKA telescope.

The construction phase of the main telescope at this site began on 5 December 2022, celebrated with a ceremony. The site has been named Inyarrimanha Ilgari Bundara, meaning 'sharing sky and stars' in the Wajarri language. This telescope comprises 100,000 antennas built across 74 kilometres (46 mi). Bulldozers are expected to start working on the site in early 2023, with the estimated completion date in 2028.

== Experimental projects ==
Several smaller experiments (CORE, EDGES, PAPER and SCOPE) are being sited at MRO.

=== Experiment to Detect the Global EoR Signature (EDGES) ===
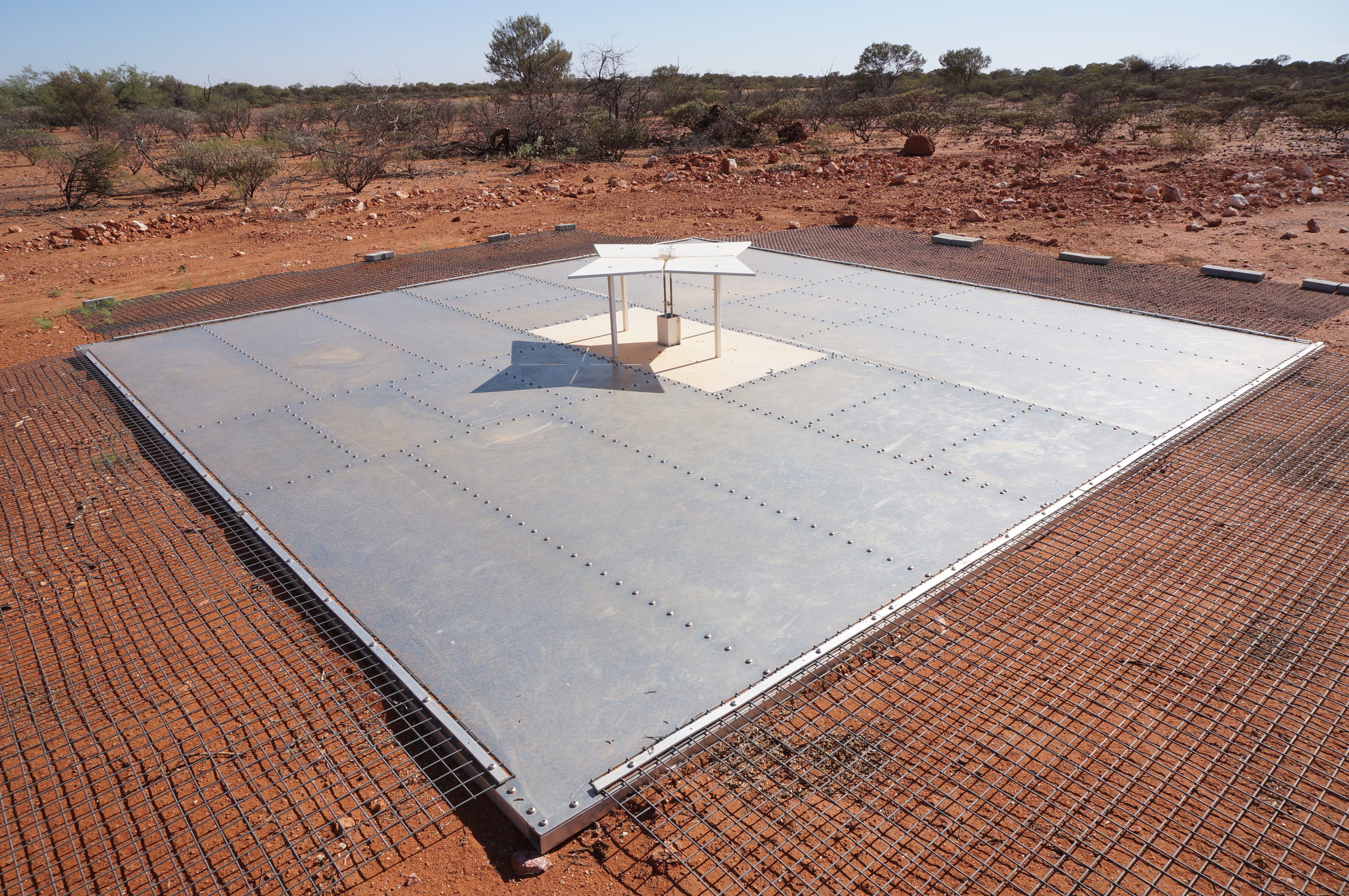
The antenna and low noise amplifier for the EDGES experiment, at the Murchison Radio-astronomy Observatory

The Experiment to Detect the Global EoR (Epoch of Reionization) Signature (EDGES) is a radio telescope being developed by MIT Haystack Observatory and Arizona State University (ASU) to make accurate measurements of the sky brightness temperature between 50 MHz and 200 MHz. Its scientific objective is the detection of the global (sky-average) redshifted 21-cm line from Cosmic Dawn and the Epoch of Reionization corresponding to the redshift range 27 $> z >$ 6.

== See also ==
- List of astronomical observatories
