= Murchison, Western Australia =

Murchison
- Town
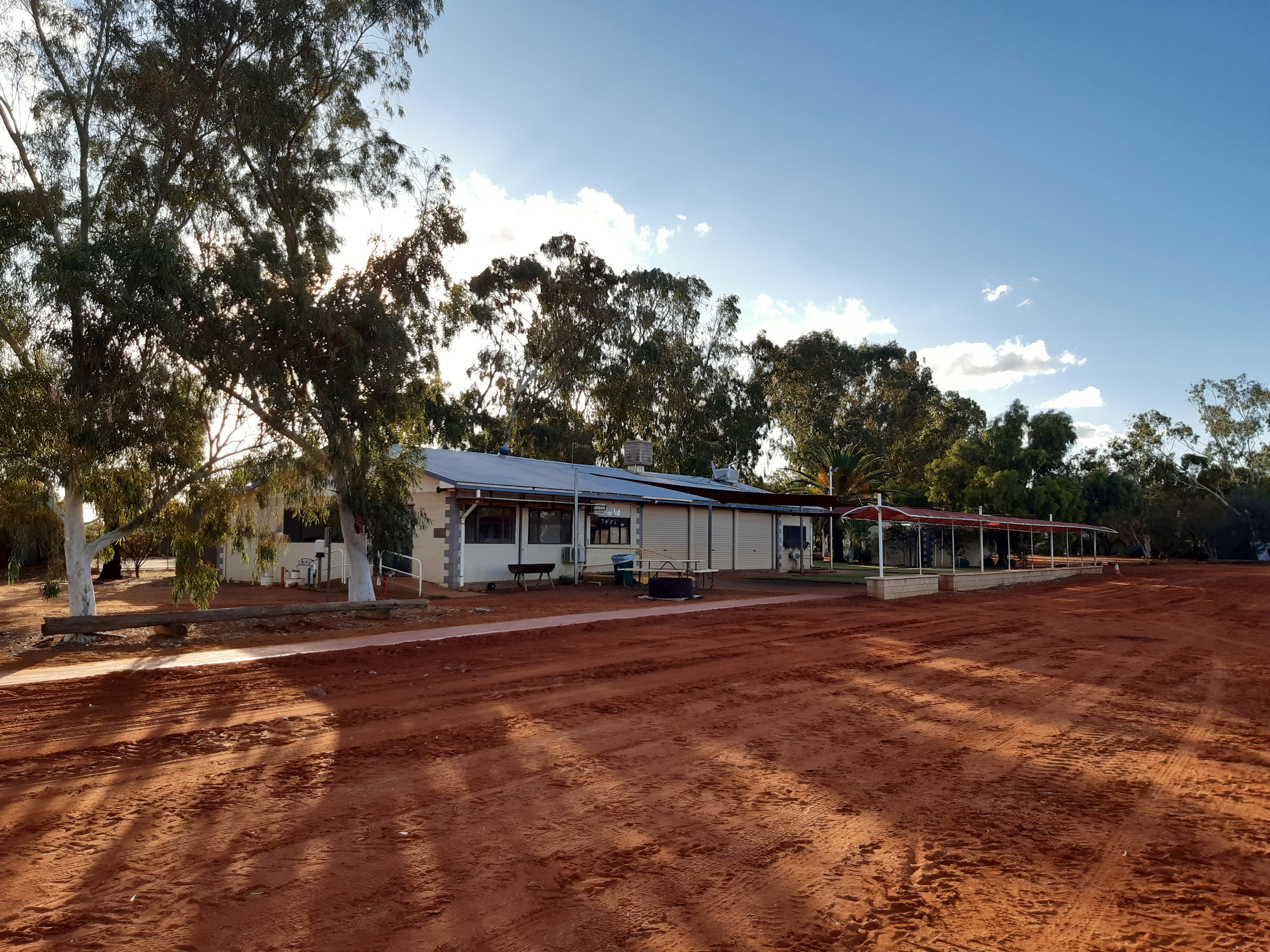

- Interactive map of Murchison
- Coordinates: 26°53′34.390″S 115°57′22.421″E
- Country: Australia
- State: Western Australia
- LGA: Shire of Murchison

Government
  - State electorate: North West
  - Federal division: Durack

Population
  - Total: 30 (2021)
- Postcode: 6630

Murchison is a locality in the Mid West region of Western Australia. At the 2021 census, Murchison recorded a population of 30.

== Demographics ==
As of the 2021 Australian census, 30 people resided in Murchison, down from 62 in the 2016 census. The median age of persons in Murchison was 44 years. There were fewer males than females, with 46.9% of the population male and 53.1% female. The average household size was 2 people per household.
