= Shire of Murchison =

Local government area in the Mid West region of Western Australia

Coordinates: 26°53.61′S 115°57.39′E

- Local government area
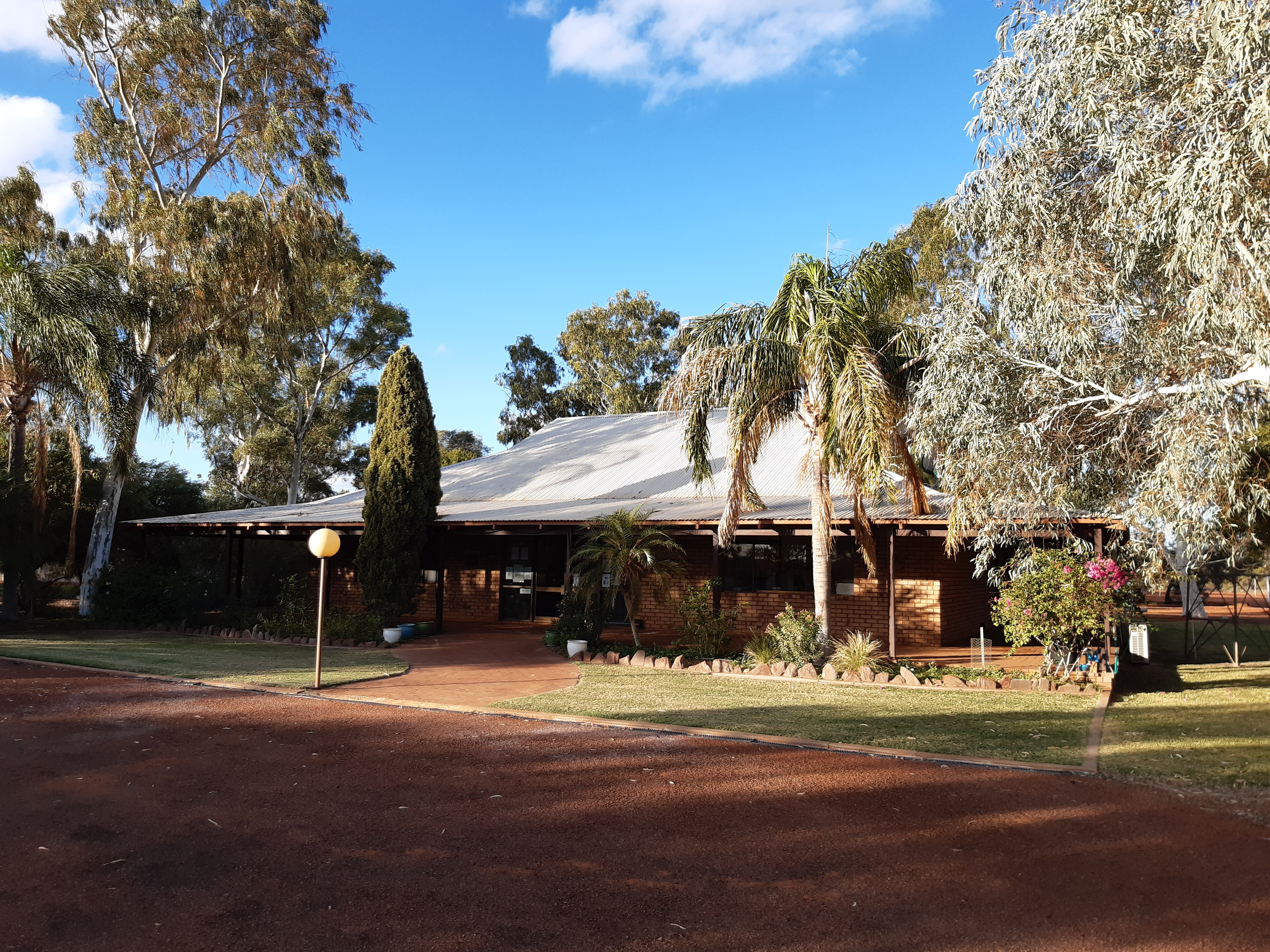
- The Murchison Shire offices

- Interactive map of Shire of Murchison
- Country: Australia
- State: Western Australia
- Region: Mid West
- Established: 1875
- Council seat: Murchison Settlement

Government
  - Shire President: Ross Foulkes-Taylor
  - State electorate: North West
  - Federal division: Durack

Area
  - Total: 49,500 km^{2} (19,100 sq mi)

Population
  - Total: 101 (LGA 2021)
- Mean max temp: 30.5 °C (86.9 °F)
- Mean min temp: 13.6 °C (56.5 °F)
- Annual rainfall: 230 mm (9.1 in)
- Website: Shire of Murchison
LGAs around Shire of Murchison
Upper Gascoyne	Upper Gascoyne	Meekatharra
Shark Bay	Shire of Murchison	Cue
Northampton	Greater Geraldton	Yalgoo

The Shire of Murchison is a 49,500 km² local government area (LGA), within the Murchison sub-region, in the Mid West region of Western Australia. Encompassing most of the Murchison and East Murchison goldfields, the shire is named after the Murchison River. It is Australia's least-populated LGA and the only one without an official town. Five sparsely populated rural localities, with a collective population of 101 (as of 2021), comprise the entire shire. The shire offices, located 300 kilometres (186 mi) northeast of Geraldton, are the focal point of Murchison Settlement, a small part of the Murchison locality.

== Description ==
The Shire of Murchison incorporates 29 pastoral stations and a population of 114. Most properties are operated by family units with their main income from cattle, meat sheep and wool, with some goats. A small tourism industry is developing in the region with some stations involved in station stays and with the Murchison Oasis Caravan Park and motel units located at the settlement providing facilities for tourists.

== History ==
The Shire of Murchison takes its name from the Murchison River, which was named in 1839 by explorer George Grey after Sir Roderick Impey Murchison, President of the Royal Geographical Society of London. The Shire’s logo is based on the coat of arms of his family, Murchison of Tarradale (lion rampant between two pineapples with a scallop shell at the base).

The Murchison Road District was gazetted on 3 August 1875. It absorbed the Upper Murchison Road District on 18 March 1912. On 1 July 1961 it became the Shire of Murchison following changes to the Local Government Act, which reformed all remaining road districts into shires.

In 2004 the shire was expanded in area when the northern part of the Shire of Mullewa and an eastern section of the Shire of Northampton were incorporated into Murchison.

== Murchison Settlement ==
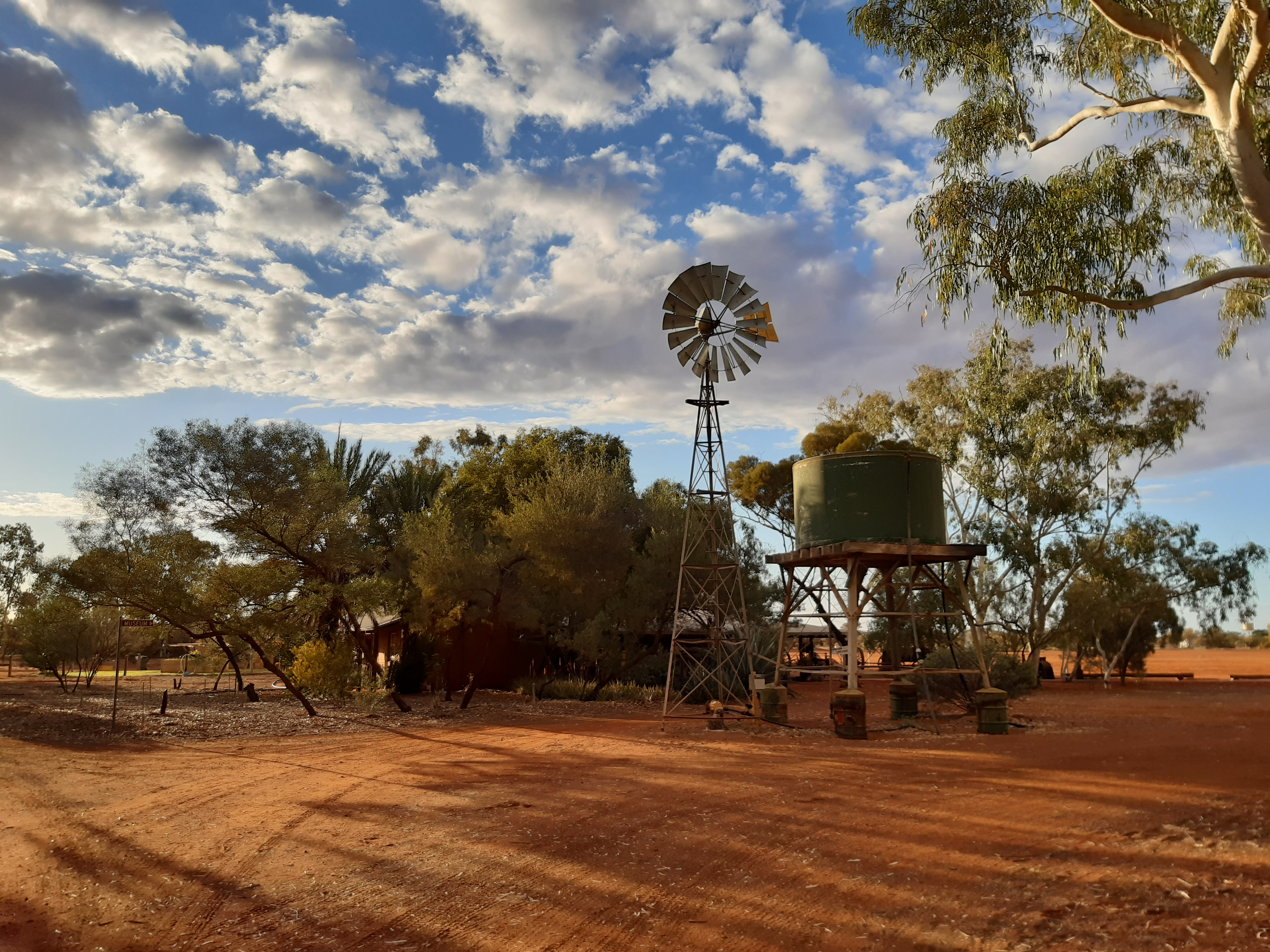
The Murchison Museum in 2020

In 1966, a new shire office, including a residence for the shire clerk was built, approximately 200 km north of Mullewa on the Carnarvon to Mullewa Road. In 1985, a roadhouse was built nearby and additional shire buildings, including a museum. The area surrounding the shire complex was gazetted as Murchison Settlement in 1988. It has come to include a few other houses and an Australia Post Community Postal Agent (CPA).

Murchison Shire Airport (ICAO airport code: YMSS), which adjoins the townsite, has a 1,448 metre all-weather runway.

== Wards ==
The shire is represented by 7 councillors, and has been divided into two wards. The shire president is elected from among the councillors.

- Darlot Ward (4 councillors)
- Ballinyoo Ward (3 councillors)

Prior to 2005, there were 4 wards – Boolardy, Byro, Mileura and Yallalong.

== Localities ==
The localities of the Shire of Murchison with population and size figures based on the most recent Australian census:

Locality	Population	Area	Map
East Murchison	0 (SAL 2021)	7,300.6 km^{2} (2,818.8 sq mi)	
Murchison	30 (SAL 2021)	23,434.2 km^{2} (9,048.0 sq mi)	
Nerramyne	6 (SAL 2021)	1,197.7 km^{2} (462.4 sq mi)	
South Murchison	73 (SAL 2021)	11,584.0 km^{2} (4,472.6 sq mi)	
Woolgorong	0 (SAL 2021)	1,408.5 km^{2} (543.8 sq mi)	

== Murchison Radio-astronomy Observatory ==
The Shire is the site of the Murchison Radio-astronomy Observatory, which lies 70 km east-northeast of Murchison Settlement. A sparse population – and its consequent radio "quietness" – is a factor behind the Shire being selected as one of the two sites for the Square Kilometre Array – a proposed array of radio telescope receivers with a total collecting area of one square kilometre. It is already home to two other major radio telescope facilities: the Murchison Widefield Array and the Australian Square Kilometre Array Pathfinder.

The Square Kilometre Array, or SKA, is a global radio telescope project involving institutions in more than 20 countries. The SKA will be the largest and most capable radio telescope ever constructed—50 times more sensitive than any other radio instrument. Australia and southern Africa will each host different components of the SKA. Management of the facilities at the SKA is coordinated by the CSIRO from the offices and laboratories at the Murchison Radio-astronomy Support Facility in Geraldton.

== Heritage-listed places ==
As of 2023, 35 places are heritage-listed in the Shire of Murchison, of which four are on the State Register of Heritage Places, among them the Boolardy Homestead. The homestead, dating back to 1875, was added to the state register on 29 May 2001.
