= PSR J0901−4046 =

Long period pulsar in the constellation Vela

Observation data Epoch J2000.0 Equinox ICRS
- Constellation: Vela
- Right ascension: 09^{h} 01^{m} 29.249 ±0.01 ^{s}
- Declination: −40° 46′ 02.984 ± 0.01″

Characteristics
- Spectral type: Pulsar

Astrometry
Distance	1,300 ly (400+100 −100 pc)

Details
Rotation	75.88554711 ± 6×10^{−8} s
Age	5.3 Myr

Database references
SIMBAD	data

PSR J0901−4046 is an ultra-long period pulsar. Its period, 75.885 seconds, is the longest for any known neutron star pulsar (some objects believed to be white dwarf pulsars, such as AR Scorpii, have longer periods). Its period is more than three times longer than that of PSR J0250+5854, the previous long period record-holder. The pulses are narrow; radio emission is seen from PSR J0901−4046 for only 0.5% of its rotation period.

PSR J0901−4046 was discovered serendipitously on September 27, 2020, by the MeerTRAP team, when a single pulse from it was noticed during MeerKAT observations of Vela X-1 (which is less than 1/4 degree away from PSR J0901−4046 on the sky). After that pulse was detected, further examination of the data revealed that 14 weaker pulses were present in the ~30 minute long data set, but they had been missed by the real-time detection software. The deepest image of the MeerKAT field showed a diffuse shell-like structure that may be a supernova remnant associated with the birth of the neutron star.

PSR J0901−4046's period, combined with its period time derivative of 2.25×10^{−13} second/second, implies a characteristic age of 5.3 million years. The discovery of PSR J0901−4046 challenges the understanding of how neutron stars evolve. Follow-up radio observations over multiple years have demonstrated that the pulse arrival times from the source are unusually stable compared to regular magnetars, which are known for frequent outburst periods accompanied by sudden changes to the timing solution. Additionally, quasi-periodic oscillation modes have been identified in some pulses from PSR J0901−4046. Such quasi-periodic sub-pulse structure has been proposed by Michael Kramer, among others, as a common feature unifying all radio-emitting neutron stars as well as Fast Radio Bursts (FRBs). PSR J0901−4046 therefore is considered a central case study in understanding how radio pulsars, magnetars, and FRBs are related.

== See also ==
- GLEAM-X J162759.5−523504.3
- GPM J1839−10
- PSR J1748−2446ad, shortest period pulsar known
