= GCRT J1745−3009 =

Radio source near the Milky Way's Galactic Center

Observation data Epoch J2000.0 Equinox ICRS
- Constellation: Scorpius
- Right ascension: 17^{h} 45^{m} 5.1^{s}
- Declination: −30° 09′ 56″

Database references
SIMBAD	data

GCRT J1745−3009 is a galactic center radio transient (GCRT), or bursting low-frequency radio source which lies in the direction of the Galactic Center.

== Discovery ==
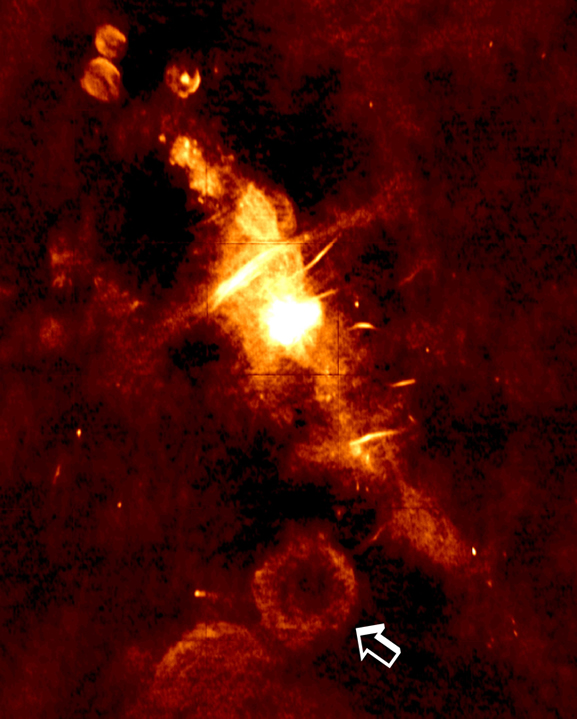
A radio image of the central region of the Milky Way galaxy. The arrow indicates the supernova remnant.

A group of astronomers from Sweet Briar College and the Naval Research Laboratory detected transient emission from two sources in 1998 while studying the Galactic Center. They then began monitoring the region specifically looking for transient sources and detected five bursts of radio waves about 1 meter in wavelength (frequency 330 MHz) during a seven-hour period from September 30 to October 1, 2002. The five bursts were of equal brightness, with each lasting about 10 minutes, and occurring every 77 minutes. Like an earlier low-frequency transient discovered by the same group, it was given the designation GCRT, an abbreviation for Galactic Center Radio Transient. The source was also nicknamed a burper. The group found no X-ray or γ-ray counterpart to the object.

Another burst from the source was later found in data recorded September 28, 2003, and a weaker burst was found in data recorded March 20, 2004. As of January 2007, no other bursts have been found.

== Structure ==
The discoverers argue that if the source is further than 70 parsecs away, its high brightness temperature would require it to be powered by a coherent emission process. (If within 70 parsecs, the source could be either coherent or incoherent.) They also claim that most known coherent emission processes are unlikely explanations for the source. Models proposed by others include a nulling pulsar, a pair of orbiting neutron stars, a radio-emitting white dwarf, and a pulsar precessing with a period of 77 minutes.

== See also ==
- GLEAM-X J162759.5−523504.3
- Rotating radio transients
- Long Period Radio Transients
