= Murchison Widefield Array =

Radio telescope in Western Australia

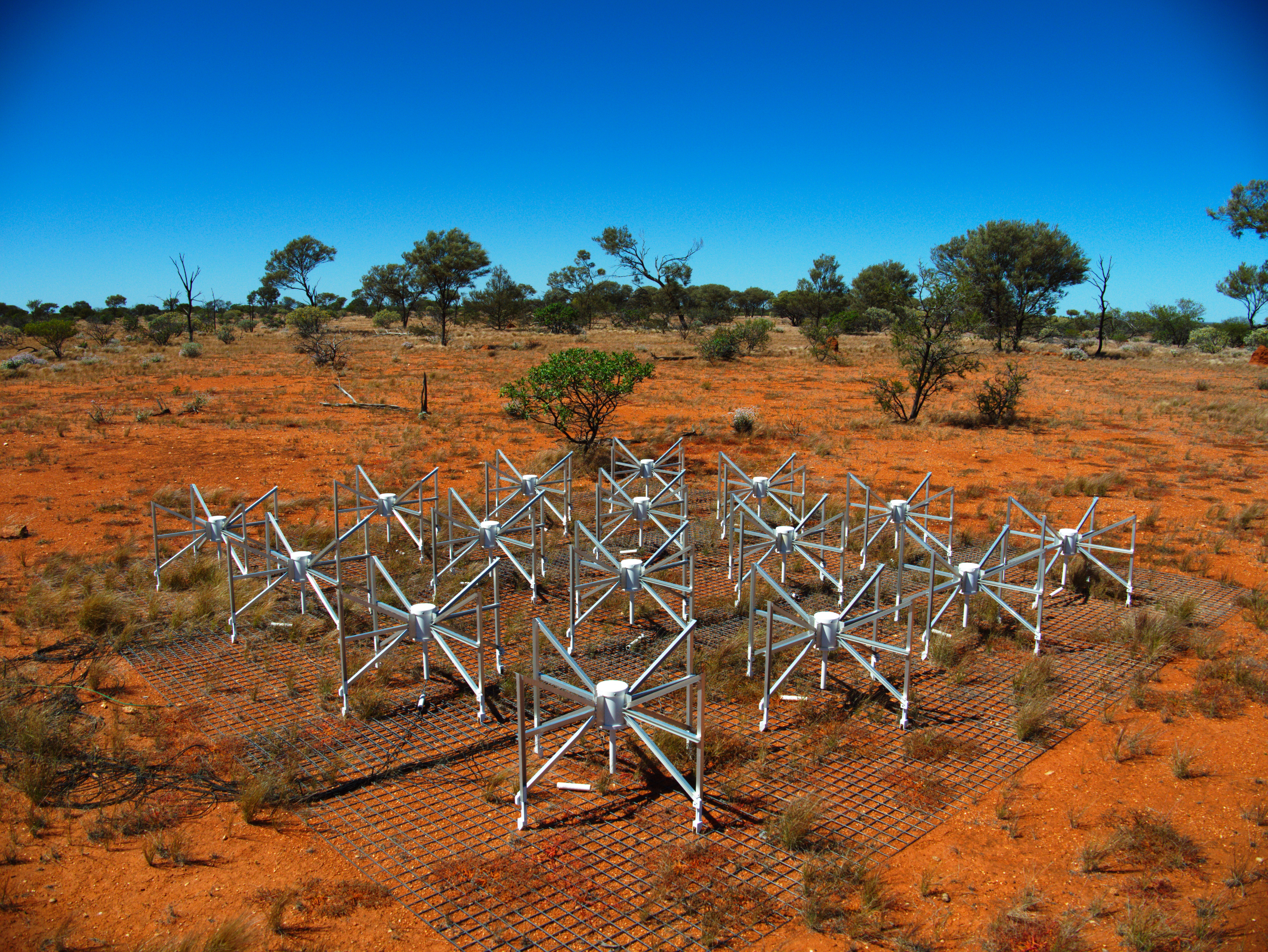
- An individual MWA-32T tile
- Location: Western Australia, AUS
- Coordinates: 26°42′12″S 116°40′16″E
- Wavelength: 3.75, 1 m (80, 300 MHz)
- Diameter: 3 km (9,842 ft 6 in)
- Collecting area: 512 m^{2} (5,510 sq ft)
- Website: www.mwatelescope.org
- Location within Australia
- Related media on Commons

The Murchison Widefield Array (MWA) is a joint project between an international consortium of organisations to construct and operate a low-frequency radio array. "Widefield" refers to its very large field of view (on the order of 30 degrees across). Operating in the frequency range 70–300 MHz, the main scientific goals of the MWA are to detect neutral atomic hydrogen emission from the cosmological Epoch of Reionization (EoR), to study the Sun, the heliosphere, the Earth's ionosphere, and radio transient phenomena, as well as map the extragalactic radio sky. It is located at the Murchison Radio-astronomy Observatory (MRO).

Along with the Australian Square Kilometre Array Pathfinder (ASKAP), also at the MRO, and two radio telescopes in South Africa, the Hydrogen Epoch of Reionization Array (HERA) and MeerKAT, the MWA is one of four precursors to the international project known as the Square Kilometre Array (SKA).

== Development ==
The MWA was to be situated at Mileura Station where initial testing had been conducted then moved southwest to Boolardy Station in outback Western Australia, at the Murchison Radio-astronomy Observatory (MRO), 800 kilometres (500 mi) north of Perth. This location offers a quiet radio environment and stable climate for observations. The MRO is also the site of CSIRO's Australian Square Kilometre Array Pathfinder (ASKAP) and one of two selected sites in Australia for the Square Kilometre Array (SKA). In addition to the geographic link, the MWA is one of four official SKA precursor telescopes – instruments that provide instrumental, scientific and operational information to help guide SKA developments, along with two sites in South Africa, HERA and MeerKAT.

The MWA was initially conceived as a 512-tile instrument (512T) to be built in stages. The first stage was a 32-tile prototype (MWA-32T), which was constructed and operated with increasing capability over the period 2007–2011, testing telescope hardware and making preliminary science observations, including initial observations of EoR fields.

The first phase of the telescope, the so-called "Phase I MWA", achieved full practical completion in late 2012 and completed commissioning on 20 June 2013, before moving into full operations. The Phase I MWA fully cross-correlates signals from 128 phased tiles, each of which consist of 16 crossed dipoles arranged in a 4×4 square. As part of a planned future rollout, infrastructure on-site at the MRO was installed during Phase I to allow an eventual build-out to 256 tiles. The total cost of the first phase of the project was A$51 million.

In 2017 the telescope received the planned upgrade, doubling the number of antennas, resulting in an increase in both resolution and sensitivity. This upgraded instrument is known as the "Phase II MWA". Phase II was practically completed in October 2017 and officially launched on 23 April 2018. Installation of the additional antennas and commissioning of the array was led by the third MWA director, Randall Wayth, while operations of the Phase II instruments have been led by the fourth director, Melanie Johnston-Hollitt.

The third phase of the project commenced in 2022 with the addition of the MWAX correlator. This was followed by instrumentation upgrades through to 2025, with the deployment of a new fleet of digital receivers, designed and built by the MWA Collaboration, led by current MWA director Steven Tingay. These receivers complement existing receivers, such that the MWA now supports the full correlation of all 256 MWA antenna tiles. This upgrade, known as 'Phase III' of the MWA, means that the maximum instantaneous sensitivity of the MWA is doubled and the data output of the telescope is quadrupled, providing a clearer and more expansive view of the universe.

== Science ==
The MWA is an inherently versatile instrument with a very large field of view, on the order of 30 degrees across, able to cover a wide range of scientific goals. In Phase I the array provided a wealth of scientific papers covering topics such as detection of H II region(s) in the Galactic plane, limits on radio emission from extra-solar planets, observations of haloes and relics in galaxy clusters to detection of transient radio sources and space debris tracking. Two of the most significant results from the Phase I MWA were:

- The first detection of plasma tubes in the ionosphere by undergraduate student Cleo Loi. Loi won the Astronomical Society of Australia 2015 Bok Prize for her research.
- The "Galactic and Extragalactic All-sky MWA" (or "GLEAM") is a survey of 300,000 extragalactic sources at 20 frequencies between 70 and 230 MHz that was carried out by the MWA.

A second survey, GLEAM-X, was run for 113 nights from 2018 to 2020.

=== Discoveries ===
In January 2022, a team led by Dr Natasha Hurley-Walker of Curtin University re-analyzed 2018 GLEAM data and announced in Nature that object GLEAM-X J162759.5−523504.3 is a long-period (1,091.170 second / 18m11s) object, that provided a bright pulse of energy for up to a minute, and is some 4,000 light-years from Earth in the Milky Way galaxy. The derived position is in the constellation Norma at right ascension 16h 27m 59.5s, declination −52°35′04.3". The object produces pulses at 154MHz of peak flux densities of up to S154MHz = 45 Jy. Scaling this to 1.4 GHz would indicate S1.4 GHz = 3.5 Jy and, therefore, a luminosity L1.4 GHz = 4×10^31ergs^{−1}. It is speculated to be similar to a pulsar or magnetar. The object was discovered by Tyrone O'Doherty as part of his undergraduate honours project supervised by Dr Hurley-Walker.

== System overview ==
An MWA antenna consists of a four-by-four regular grid of dual-polarization dipole elements arranged on a 4m × 4m steel mesh ground plane. Each antenna (with its 16 dipoles) is known as a "tile". Signals from each dipole pass through a low-noise amplifier (LNA) and are combined in an analogue beamformer to produce tile beams on the sky. Beamformers sit next to the tiles in the field. The radio-frequency (RF) signals from the tile-beams are transmitted to a receiver, each receiver being able to process the signals from a group of eight tiles. Receivers therefore sit in the field, close to groups of eight tiles; cables between receivers and beamformers carry data, power, and control signals. Power for the receivers is provided from a central generator. The receiver contains analogue elements to condition the signals in preparation for sampling and digitization. The frequency range 80–300 MHz is Nyquist-sampled at high precision. Digital elements in the receiver (after the digitizer) are used to transform the time-series data to the frequency domain with a 1.28 MHz resolution – 5 bits real and 5 bits imaginary for each resolution element. Sets of 1.28 MHz coarse frequency channels are transmitted via an optical fiber connection to the correlator subsystem, located in the CSIRO Data Processing Facility near the MWA site. MWA shares the CSIRO facility with the ASKAP program.

In Phase I, the majority of the tiles (112) were scattered across a roughly 1.5 km core region, forming an array with very high imaging quality, and a field of view of several hundred square degrees at a resolution of several arcminutes. The remaining 16 tiles are placed at locations outside the core, yielding baseline distances of about 3 km to allow higher angular resolution observations.

In Phase II, the MWA operated in two configurations, a compact configuration and an extended configuration of 128 tiles each. The compact configuration consists of seven Phase I receivers and 56 tiles, plus 72 new tiles arranged in two dense hexagonal configurations each of 36 close-packed tiles. The new hexagonal super tiles in the compact configuration make use of the concept of "redundant spacings" to help calibrate the array to high precision for detection of the EoR. The extended configuration consists of nine Phase I receivers and 72 original tiles, plus an additional 56 new long-baseline tiles that provide baselines distances of about 5 km.

The original correlator subsystem comprises Poly-phase Filter Bank (PFB) boards that convert the 1.28 MHz coarse frequency channels into channels with 10 kHz frequency resolution in preparation for cross-correlation. Correlator boards then cross-multiply signals from all tiles to form visibility data. A distributed clock signal drives the coherence of receivers in the field and maintains timing for the correlator. This system is only capable of ingesting the data from 128 tiles and thus, while the array currently comprises 256 tiles, only half of the tiles are correlated at a time, giving rise to the two configurations discussed above. The MWA Collaboration plan to replace this correlator in the near future with a newer machine, capable of ingesting the data from all 256 tiles.

The MWA is operated remotely through an interface to a Monitor and Control (M&C) software package resident on a dedicated computer located within the CSIRO Data Processing Facility at the MWA site. The M&C software maintains a state-based description of the hardware and an event-driven database describing the observation scheduling of the Instrument. M&C software commands several elements of the system including pointing and tracking of the beamformers, frequency selection of the receivers, correlation parameters for the correlator, and RTC/RTS functions, amongst others. The M&C system contributes to the MWA archive by storing instrument "metadata" into an external database. This includes both the instrument configurations for each observation and also housekeeping information collected from various hardware components.

Data are transferred from the site to the MWA archive located at the end of a high-bandwidth network connection. The primary MWA data archive is located in Perth at the Pawsey Supercomputing Centre. As of December 2018 the resultant initially calibrated data are then provided to the international astronomical community via the MWA node of the Australian All-Sky Virtual Observatory (ASVO). Significant processed data products produced by the MWA Collaboration such as the initial release of the GLEAM survey are also available via various international scientific databases for subsequent analysis and interpretation.

== Project partners ==
During Phase I, the MWA consortium initially comprised 110 individual researchers drawn from 12 institutions from Australia, New Zealand, the United States and India. New Zealand joined the consortium in late 2011 and an additional two institutions from the United States were added in 2014 taking the total number of Phase I partner organizations to 14. By the end of Phase I there were 160 individual research scientists involved in the MWA.

Membership of the MWA consortium was substantially expanded for Phase II with the admission of Canada, China and Japan, though India left the consortium at this time. Nevertheless, at the start of Phase II the MWA had expanded to 21 partner organizations across six countries and had a membership of 270 individual scientists. The expansion of the collaboration was largely the work of the then MWA Board Chair (January 2014 – January 2018) and past MWA director, Melanie Johnston-Hollitt.

By 2024 the consortium had increased its partner organisations significantly, with the addition of Switzerland, and a total of 30 partner organisations across six countries and a membership of 243 individual scientists.

The MWA Project is composed of the following Consortium Leads as of 2025:

- Curtin University (Lead Organization)
- Brown University (US Consortium Lead)
- École Polytechnique Fédérale de Lausanne (EPFL) (Switzerland Consortium Lead)
- Kumamoto University (Japan Consortium Lead)
- Shanghai Astronomical Observatory (China Consortium Lead)
- University of Alberta (Canada Consortium Lead)

Funding for the MWA to date has been provided by partner institutions and by allocations from national funding agencies: the New Zealand Ministry of Economic Development (now the Ministry of Business, Innovation and Employment), the United States National Science Foundation, the Australian Research Council (ARC), the Australian National Collaborative Research Infrastructure Strategy (NCRIS) administered by Astronomy Australia Ltd., and the Australia-India Strategic Research Fund Overview (AISRF). In addition, support for the MWA computer hardware was given through an IBM Shared University Research Grant awarded to Victoria University of Wellington and Curtin University (PIs: Johnston-Hollitt and Tingay).

== See also ==
- List of astronomical observatories
- LOFAR
