= Rotating radio transient =

Phenomenon in radio astronomy

Rotating radio transients (RRATs) are sources of short, moderately bright, radio pulses, which were first discovered in 2006. RRATs are thought to be pulsars, i.e. rotating magnetised neutron stars which emit more sporadically and/or with higher pulse-to-pulse variability than the bulk of the known pulsars. The working definition of what a RRAT is, is a pulsar which is more easily discoverable in a search for bright single pulses, as opposed to in Fourier domain searches so that 'RRAT' is little more than a label (of how they are discovered) and does not represent a distinct class of objects from pulsars. As of March 2015 over 100 have been reported.

== General characteristics ==
Pulses from RRATs are short in duration, lasting from a few milliseconds. The pulses are comparable to the brightest single pulses observed from pulsars with flux densities of a few Jansky at 1.4 GHz. Andrew Lyne, a radio astronomer involved in the discovery of RRATs, "guesses that there are only a few dozen brighter radio sources in the sky." The time intervals between detected bursts range from seconds (one pulse period) to hours. Thus radio emission from RRATs is typically only detectable for less than one second per day.

The sporadic emission from RRATs means that they are usually not detectable in standard periodicity searches which use Fourier techniques. Nevertheless, underlying periodicity in RRATs can be determined by finding the greatest common denominator of the intervals between pulses. This yields the maximum period but once many pulse arrival times have been determined the periods which are shorter (by an integer factor) can be deemed statistically unlikely. The periods thus determined for RRATs are on the order of 1 second or longer, implying that the pulses are likely to be coming from rotating neutron stars, and led to the name "Rotating Radio Transient" being given. The periods seen in some RRATs are longer than in most radio pulsars, somewhat expected for sources which are (by definition) discovered in searches for individual pulses. Monitoring of RRATs for the past few years has revealed that they are slowing down. For some of the known RRATs this slow-down rate, while small, is larger than that for typical pulsars, and which is again more in line with that of magnetars.

The neutron star nature of RRATs was further confirmed when X-ray observations of the RRAT J1819-1458 were made using the space-based Chandra X-ray Observatory. Cooling neutron stars have temperatures of order 1 million kelvins and so thermally emit at X-ray wavelengths. Measurement of an x-ray spectrum allows the temperature to be determined, assuming it is thermal emission from the surface of a neutron star. The resulting temperature for RRAT J1819-1458 is much cooler than that found on the surface of magnetars, and suggests that despite some shared properties between RRATs and magnetars, they belong to different populations of neutron stars. None of the other pulsars identified as RRATs has yet been detected in X-ray observation. This is in fact the only detection of these sources outside of the radio band.

== Discovery ==
After the discovery of pulsars in 1967, searches for more pulsars relied on two key characteristics of pulsar pulses in order to distinguish pulsars from noise caused by terrestrial radio signals. The first is the periodic nature of pulsars. By performing periodicity searches through data, "pulsars are detected with much higher signal-to-noise ratios" than when simply looking for individual pulses. The second defining characteristic of pulsar signals is the dispersion in frequency of an individual pulse, due to the frequency dependence of the phase velocity of an electromagnetic wave that travels through an ionized medium. As the interstellar medium features an ionized component, waves traveling from a pulsar to Earth are dispersed, and thus pulsar surveys also focused on searching for dispersed waves. The importance of the combination of the two characteristics is such that in initial data processing from the Parkes Multibeam Pulsar Survey, which is the largest pulsar survey to date, "no search sensitive to single dispersed pulses was included."

After the survey itself had finished, searches began for single dispersed pulses. About a quarter of the pulsars already detected by the survey were found by searching for single dispersed pulses, but there were 17 sources of single dispersed pulses which were not thought to be associated with a pulsar. During follow-up observations, a few of these were found to be pulsars that had been missed in periodicity searches, but 11 sources were characterized by single dispersed pulses, with irregular intervals between pulses lasting from minutes to hours.

As of March 2015 over 100 have been reported, with dispersion measures up to 764 cm^{−3}pc.

== Possible pulse mechanisms ==
In order to explain the irregularity of RRAT pulses, we note that most of the pulsars which have been labelled as RRATs are entirely consistent with pulsars which have regular underlying emission which is simply undetectable due to the low intrinsic brightness or large distance of the sources. However, assuming that when we do not detect pulses from these pulsars that they are truly 'off', several authors have proposed mechanisms whereby such sporadic emission could be explained. For example, as pulsars gradually lose energy, they approach what is called the pulsar "death valley," a theoretical area in pulsar pulsar period—period derivative space, where the pulsar emission mechanism is thought to fail but may become sporadic as pulsars approach this region. However although this is consistent with some of the behavior of RRATs, the RRATs with known periods and period derivatives do not lie near canonical death regions. Another suggestion is that asteroids might form in the debris of the supernova that formed the neutron star, and infall of these debris in to the light cone of RRATs and some other types of pulsars might cause some of the irregular behavior observed. Since most RRATs have large dispersion measures that indicate larger distances, combining with the similar emission properties, some RRATs could be due to the telescope detection threshold. Nevertheless, the possibility that RRATs share the similar emission mechanism with those pulsars with so called "giant pulses" can neither be excluded. To fully understand the emission mechanisms of RRATs would require directly observing the debris surrounding a neutron star, which is not possible now, but may be possible in the future with the Square Kilometer Array. Nevertheless, as more RRATs are detected by observatories such as Arecibo, the Green Bank Telescope, and the Parkes Observatory at which RRATs were first discovered, some of the characteristics of RRATs may become clearer.

== See also ==
- Accretion-powered pulsar
- Anomalous X-ray pulsar
- Fast radio burst—have large DM with some confirmed at cosmological distances
- Long Period Radio Transients
- Soft gamma repeater
