= KAT-7 =

Radio telescope in South Africa

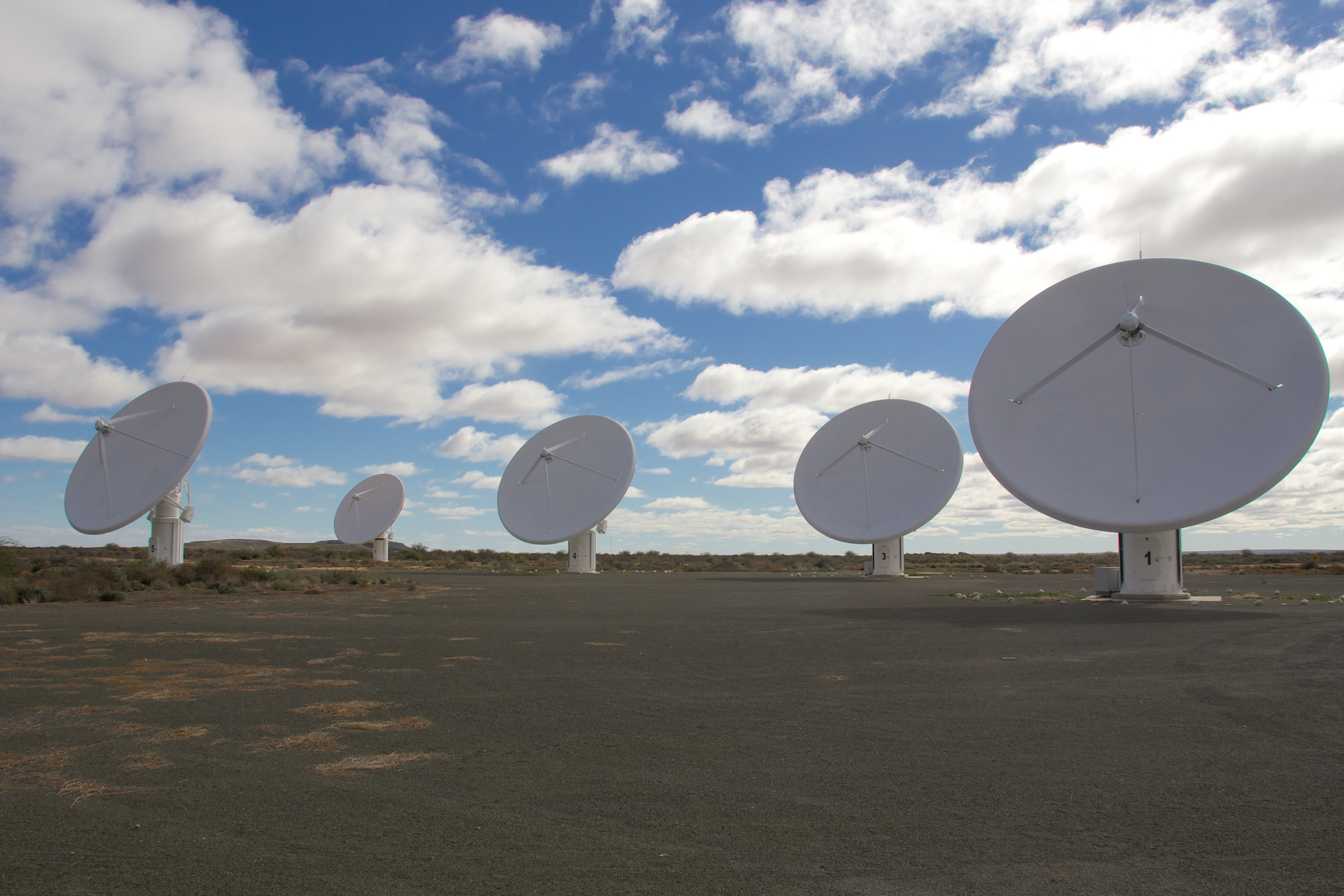
- Five antennas of KAT-7 in 2014
- Location(s): South Africa
- Coordinates: 30°43′16″S 21°24′40″E
- Altitude: 1,100 m (3,600 ft)
- Wavelength: 3 cm (10.0 GHz)–30 cm (1,000 MHz)
- Diameter: 12 m (39 ft 4 in)
- Collecting area: 2,000 m^{2} (22,000 sq ft)
- Website: www.ska.ac.za
- Location of KAT-7
- Related media on Commons

KAT-7 is a radio telescope situated in the Meerkat National Park, in the Northern Cape of South Africa. Developed as the precursor engineering test bed to the larger MeerKAT telescope, previously known as Karoo Array Telescope (KAT), it has become a science instrument in its own right. The construction was completed in 2011 and commissioning in 2012. It also served as a technology demonstrator for South Africa's bid to host the Square Kilometre Array. KAT-7 is the first Radio telescope to be built with a composite reflector and uses a stirling pump for 75 K cryogenic cooling. The telescope was built to test various systems for the MeerKAT array, from the ROACH correlators designed and manufactured in Cape Town, now used by various telescopes internationally, to composite construction techniques.

== Technical specifications ==
KAT-7 consist of 7 dishes of 12 metres in diameter, each a prime focus reflecting telescope.

Key performance parameters
Parameter	Value
Number of antennae	7
Dish diameter	12 m
Minimum baseline	26 m
Maximum baseline	185 m
Frequency Range	1200...1950 MHz
Instantaneous Bandwidth	256 MHz
Polarisation	Linear (H + V)
Tsys	for all elevation angles above 30°: < 35 K across the entire frequency band ~ 30 K average
Elevation	2...95°

Correlator Modes:
Mode	# Bands	Band Bandwidth	Channel Bandwidth	available?
Wideband	1	256 MHz	390.625 kHz	Yes
8k Wideband	1	256 MHz	48.8 kHz	Yes
HI Spectral Line	1	≥ 33.4 MHz	≤ 4.8 kHz	~ Oct 2012
OH Spectral Line	1	400/32 = 12.5 MHz	1.5 kHz	~ Jun 2012
OH Spectral Line	1	400/128 = 3.1 MHz	0,381 kHz	~ Jun 2012

== Performance ==
In April 2010 four of the seven dishes were linked together as an integrated system to produce its first interferometric image of an astronomical object. In Dec 2010, there was a successful detection of very long baseline interferometry (VLBI) fringes between the Hartebeesthoek Radio Astronomy Observatory's 26 m dish and one of the KAT-7 dishes.

== See also ==
- Australian Square Kilometre Array Pathfinder
- Hartebeesthoek Radio Astronomy Observatory
- List of radio telescopes
- South African Astronomical Observatory for optical astronomy in South Africa
- Precision Array for Probing the Epoch of Reionization
