= C-Band All Sky Survey =

Radio astronomy project

- Alternative names: C-BASS
- Website: cbass.web.ox.ac.uk
- Related media on Commons

The C-Band All Sky Survey (C-BASS) is a radio astronomy project that aims to map the entire sky in the C Band (5 GHz). It has been conducted on two radio telescopes, one operating in the Karoo in South Africa, the other at Owens Valley Radio Observatory in California.

== Project description ==
The survey is a collaboration between the University of Oxford, University of Manchester, the California Institute of Technology, the Hartebeesthoek Radio Astronomy Observatory (HartRAO), and the King Abdulaziz City for Science and Technology. The initial observations were made with two telescopes; one based at the Owens Valley Radio Observatory (OVRO) in California, United States, and the other near the Meerkat National Park in Klerefontein in the Karoo desert, South Africa.

For an all sky survey two ground-based telescopes are required, one in the southern and one in the northern hemisphere.

C-BASS North was a 6.1m Gregorian telescope, the dish was donated to the project by the Jet Propulsion Laboratory.

C-BASS South is a 7.6-m Cassegrain telescope with two antennae donated by Telkom (South Africa). One was used for testing at Hartebeesthoek and the other relocated to Klerefontein. It was commissioned at Hartebeesthoek Radio Astronomy Observatory and began survey observations in 2014 when it was deployed in the Karoo. The secondary mirrors on both telescopes were supported by cones of radio-transparent foam to minimize the contamination from ground pick up and to avoid scattering the incoming polarized radiation. The C-BASS North telescope was retired in April 2015 after the initial observing phase was complete. C-BASS South continues to operate as of 2019.

C-BASS North
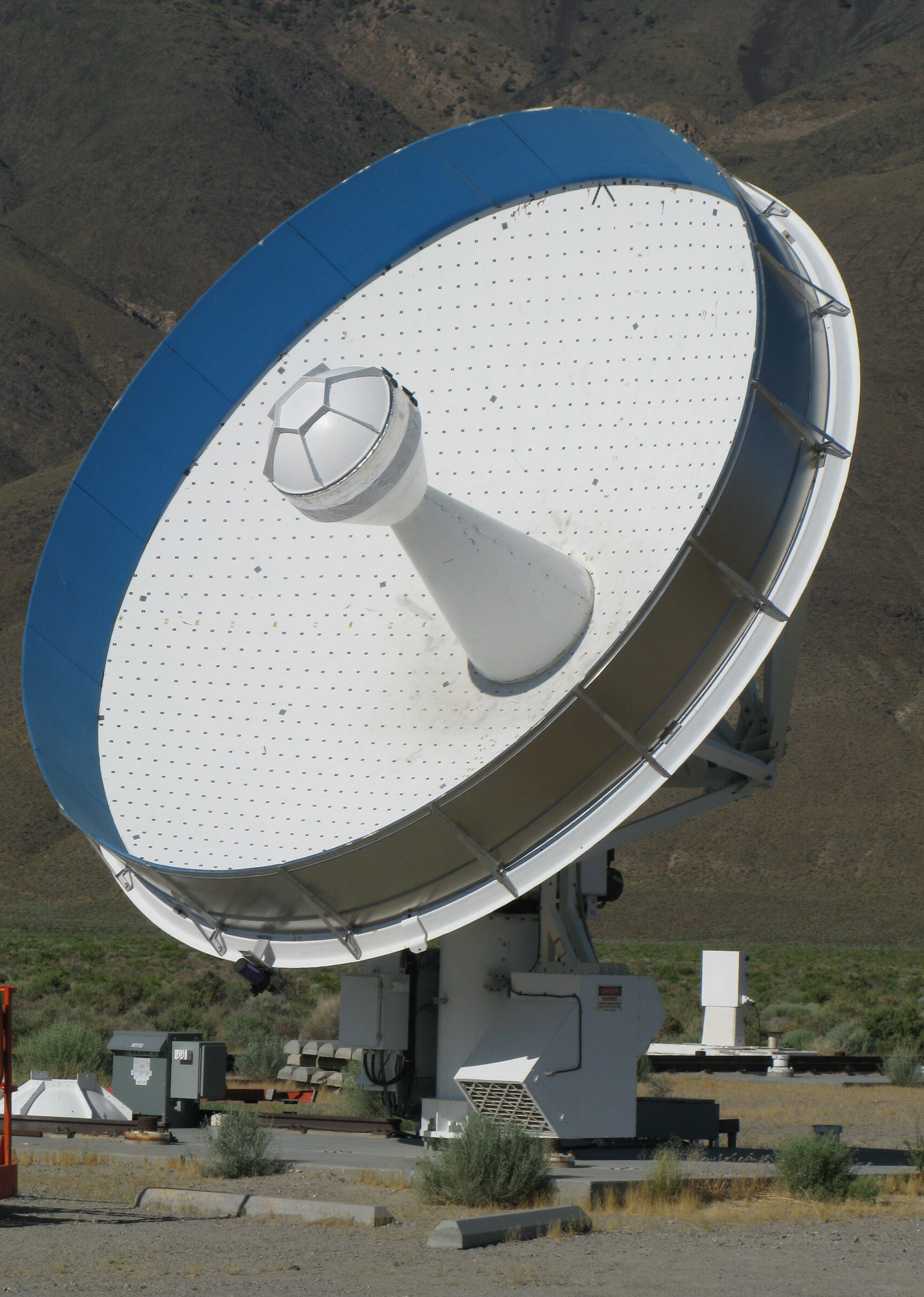
- C-BASS North at Owens Valley Radio Observatory
- Alternative names: C-BASS
- Wavelength: 6 cm (5.0 GHz)
- Website: cbass.web.ox.ac.uk
- Related media on Commons

C-BASS South
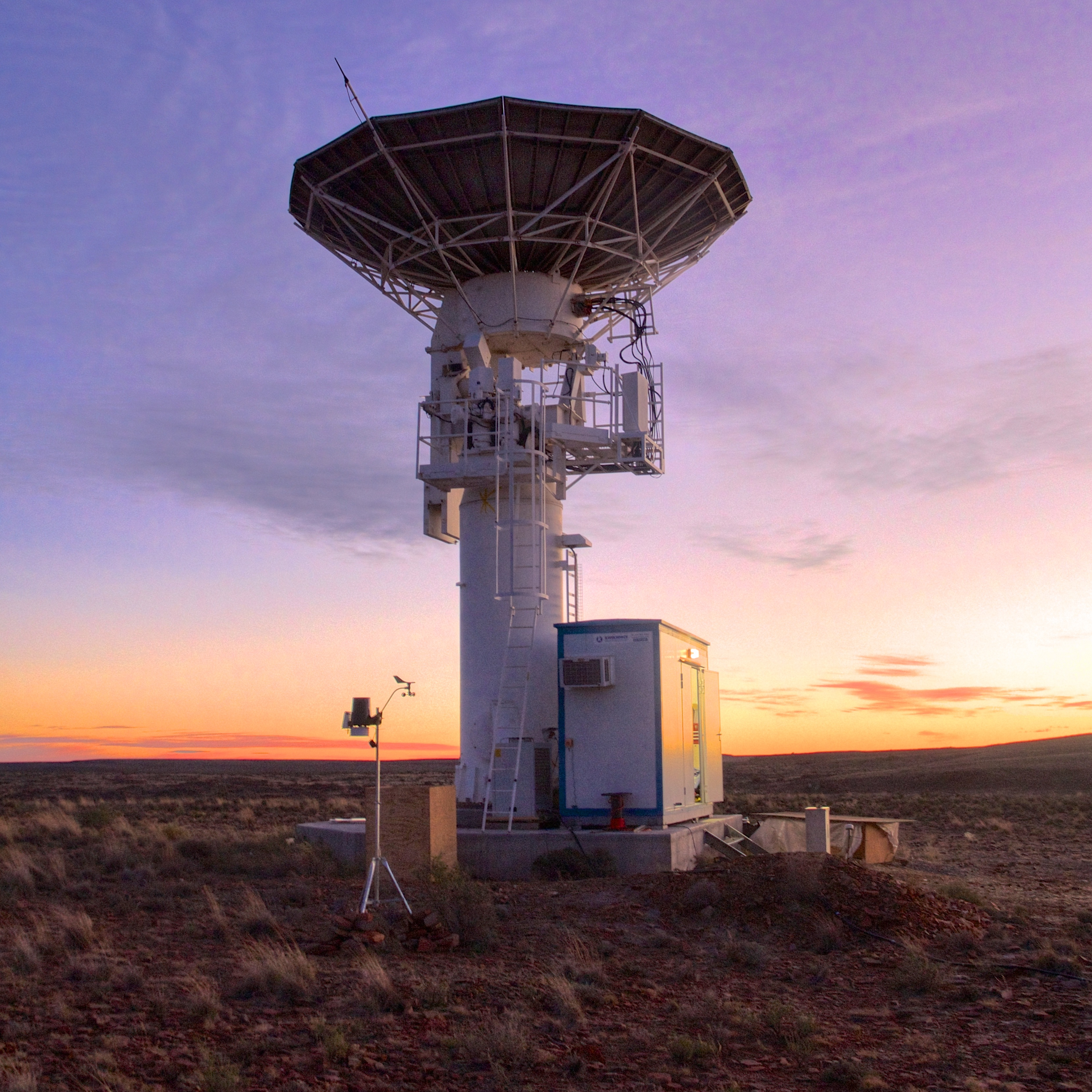
- Alternative names: C-BASS
- Wavelength: 6 cm (5.0 GHz)
- Website: cbass.web.ox.ac.uk
- Related media on Commons

== Scientific goals ==
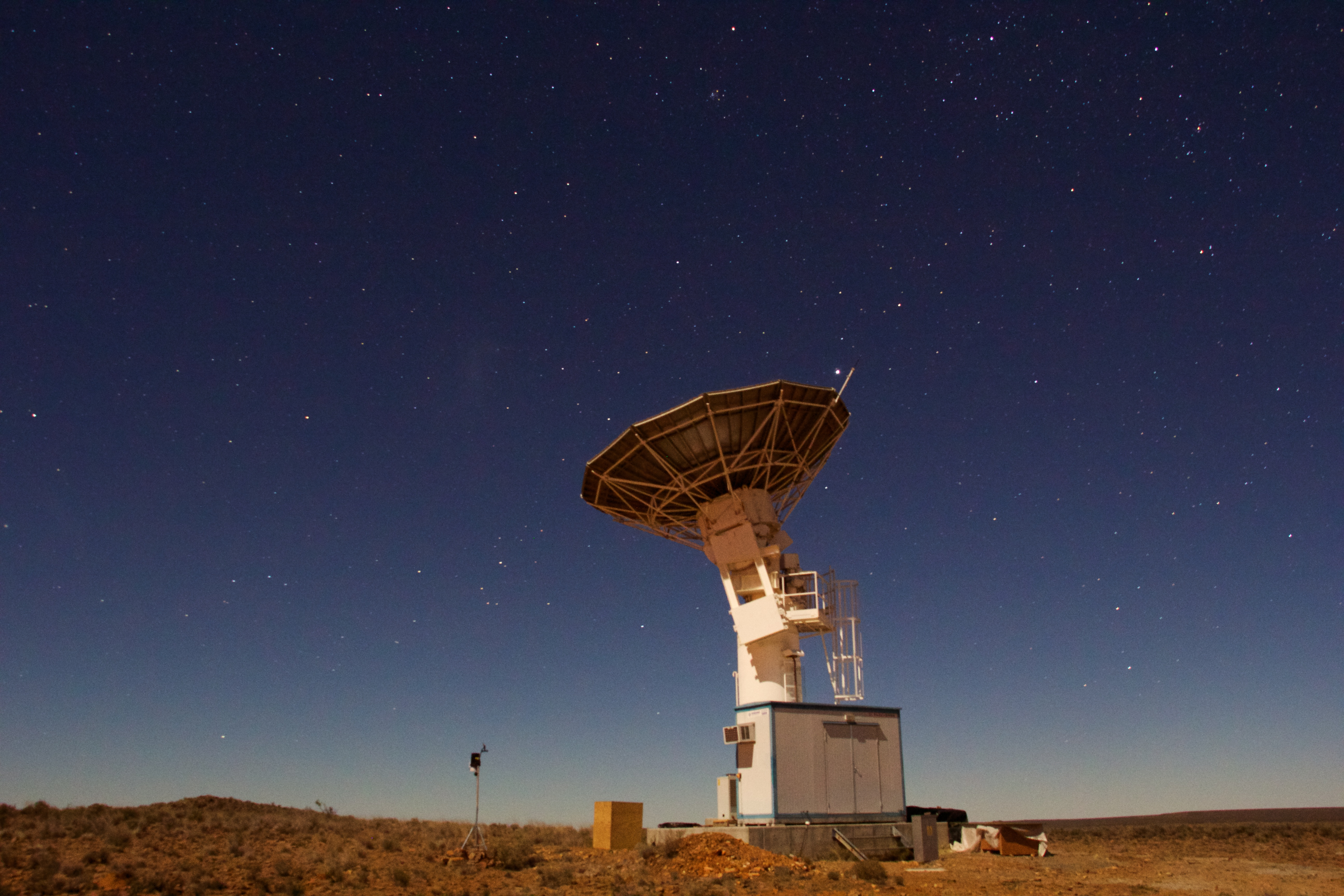
The southern C-BASS telescope in the final stages of commissioning in the Karoo.

The survey has mapped not only the intensity but also the orientation of the incoming electromagnetic waves (polarization) at every point on the sky with an angular resolution of 0.73 degrees. The angular resolution represents the smallest details that can be distinguished in the images. This has been the first survey to map the sky at a frequency of 5 GHz—low enough to be synchrotron radiation dominated but high enough to be relatively unaffected by Faraday rotation. At this frequency most of the signal comes from emissions from high-energy electrons spiralling around magnetic fields in the galaxy. This radiation is highly polarized and a major foreground distorting the Cosmic Microwave Background (CMB) signal.

The primary scientific goal of the project is to aid in the subtraction of foreground radiation, mainly from our own galaxy, from measurements of the CMB in order to improve the exactness of the CMB measurements. The CMB is polarized, this polarization can help shed light on inflation theory and gravity waves in the early universe. Secondary goals include studying the magnetic fields within the Milky Way, the WMAP Haze and spinning dust.
