= Hartebeesthoek Radio Astronomy Observatory =

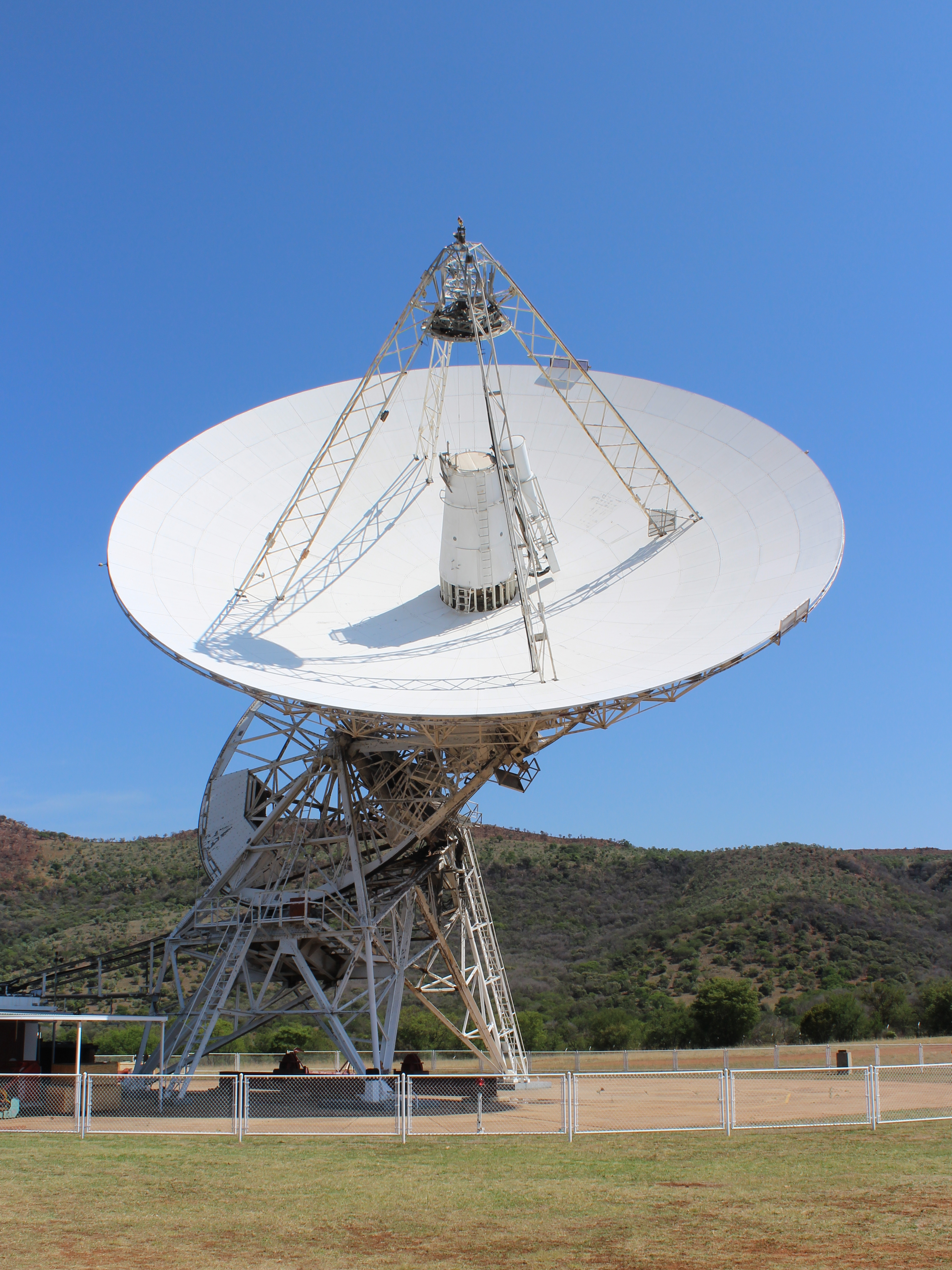
- DSS 51 at Hartebeesthoek

- Alternative names: HartRAO
- Organization: National Research Foundation
- Location: Gauteng, Transvaal region
- Coordinates: 25°53′25″S 27°41′08″E
- Established: Deep Space Station 51 - 1961; 64 years ago; Hartebeesthoek Radio Astronomy Observatory - 1975; 50 years ago
- Website: www.hartrao.ac.za
- Telescopes: HartRAO 26m Radio Telescope; MeerKAT prototype dish
- Related media on Commons

The Hartebeesthoek Radio Astronomy Observatory (HartRAO) is a radio astronomy observatory, located in a natural bowl of hills at Hartebeesthoek just south of the Magaliesberg mountain range, and about 50 km west of Johannesburg, Gauteng, South Africa. It is a National Research Facility run by South Africa's National Research Foundation. HartRAO was the only major radio astronomy observatory in Africa until the construction of the KAT-7 test bed for the future MeerKAT array in the Meerkat National Park.

== History ==
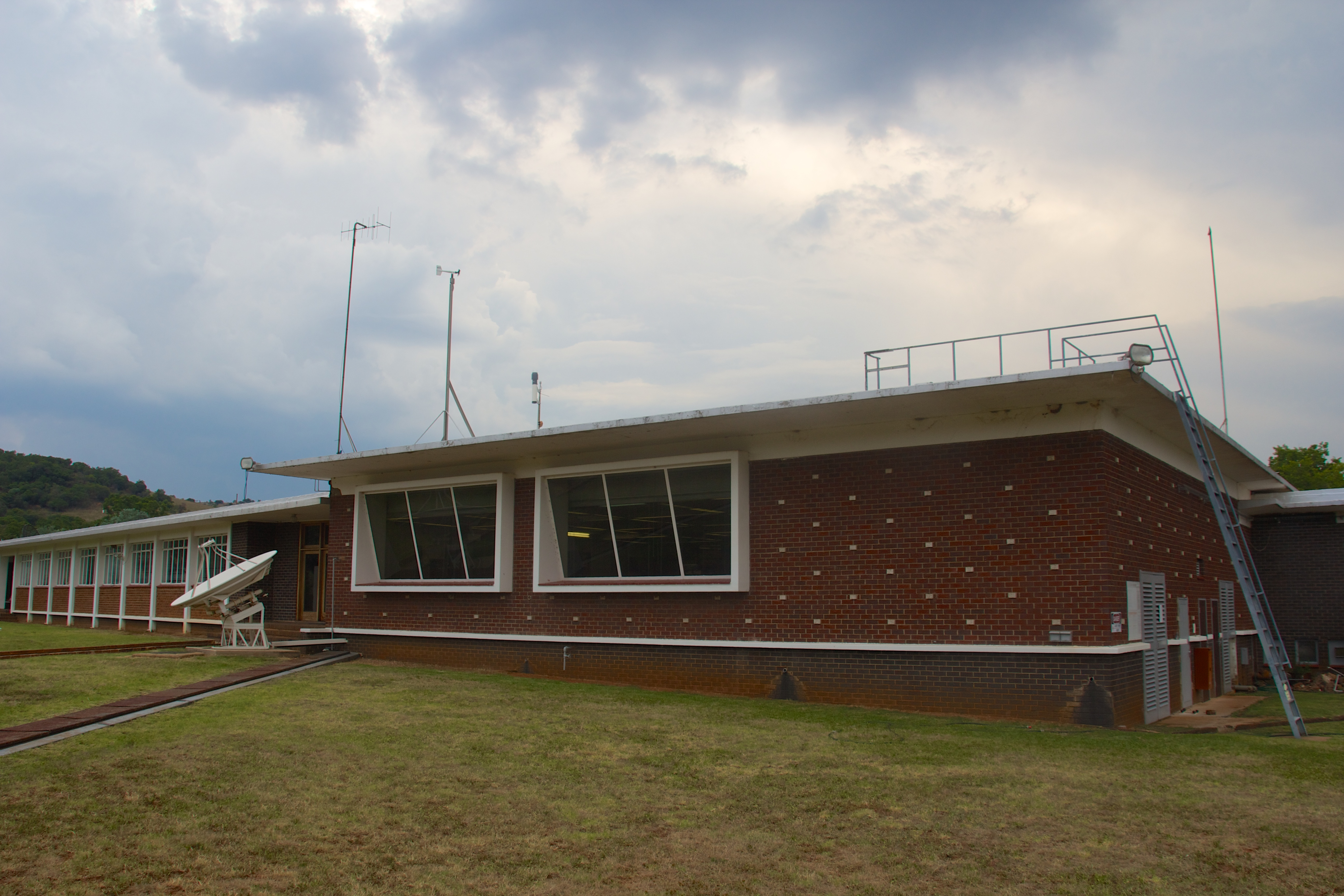
The HartRAO original control building.

The observatory was originally named Deep Space Station 51 (DSS 51) and was built in 1961 by the National Aeronautics and Space Administration (NASA). In this role the station assisted in tracking many unmanned United States space missions, including the Ranger, Surveyor and Lunar Orbiter spacecraft (which landed on the Moon or mapped it from orbit), the Mariner missions (which explored the planets Venus and Mars) and the Pioneer missions (which measured the Sun's winds).

The first Mars surface images from Mariner 4 were received at DSS 51.

NASA withdrew from the station in 1975, handing it over to South Africa's Council for Scientific and Industrial Research (CSIR), who converted it to a radio astronomy observatory. In 1988 the observatory became a National Facility operated by the Foundation for Research Development (FRD); in 1999 the FRD was restructured as the National Research Foundation (NRF).

As of 2011, NASA continues to contract for launch tracking services on an as-needed basis, and did so for the launch of the Mars Science Laboratory on 26 November 2011.

== The Radio Telescope ==
The observatory is equipped with a single 260 ton radio telescope with a main reflecting surface diameter of 26 metres. The telescope is equipped with radio receivers operating in the microwave band at wavelengths of 18 cm, 13 cm, 6 cm, 4.5 cm, 3.5 cm, 2.5 cm and 1.3 cm.

== Research ==
HartRAO is used for continuum radiometry, spectroscopy, pulsar timing and interferometry. It works together with radio telescopes in other continents as well as the orbiting radio telescopes HALCA (VSOP project) and Spektr-R (RadioAstron) in order to perform Very Long Baseline Interferometry (VLBI) observations.

HartRAO is an associate member of the European VLBI Network, but also operates with the Australia Telescope Long Baseline Array, the Asia-Pacific Telescope, the United States Very Long Baseline Array and the Global Array.

HartRAO also runs a Space Geodesy programme using VLBI, Satellite laser ranging and the Global Positioning System. Development work of a Lunar Laser Ranger (LLR) has commenced, based on a 1 m optical telescope. The LLR system will use a 100 mJ, 20 Hz, 80 ps pulse length laser to range to corner cube reflector arrays on the Moon.

The observatory also provides students and lecturers from South African universities the facilities and opportunities to perform research.

== Involvement with the Karoo Array Telescope Project ==
The XDM, a prototype dish for the MeerKAT radio telescope, was constructed at HartRAO. The XDM dish design was first used in KAT-7, a seven-dish engineering testbed and science instrument in the Meerkat National Park in Carnarvon, Northern Cape. KAT-7, completed in 2012, marked the first stage of MeerKAT development.

== Gallery ==
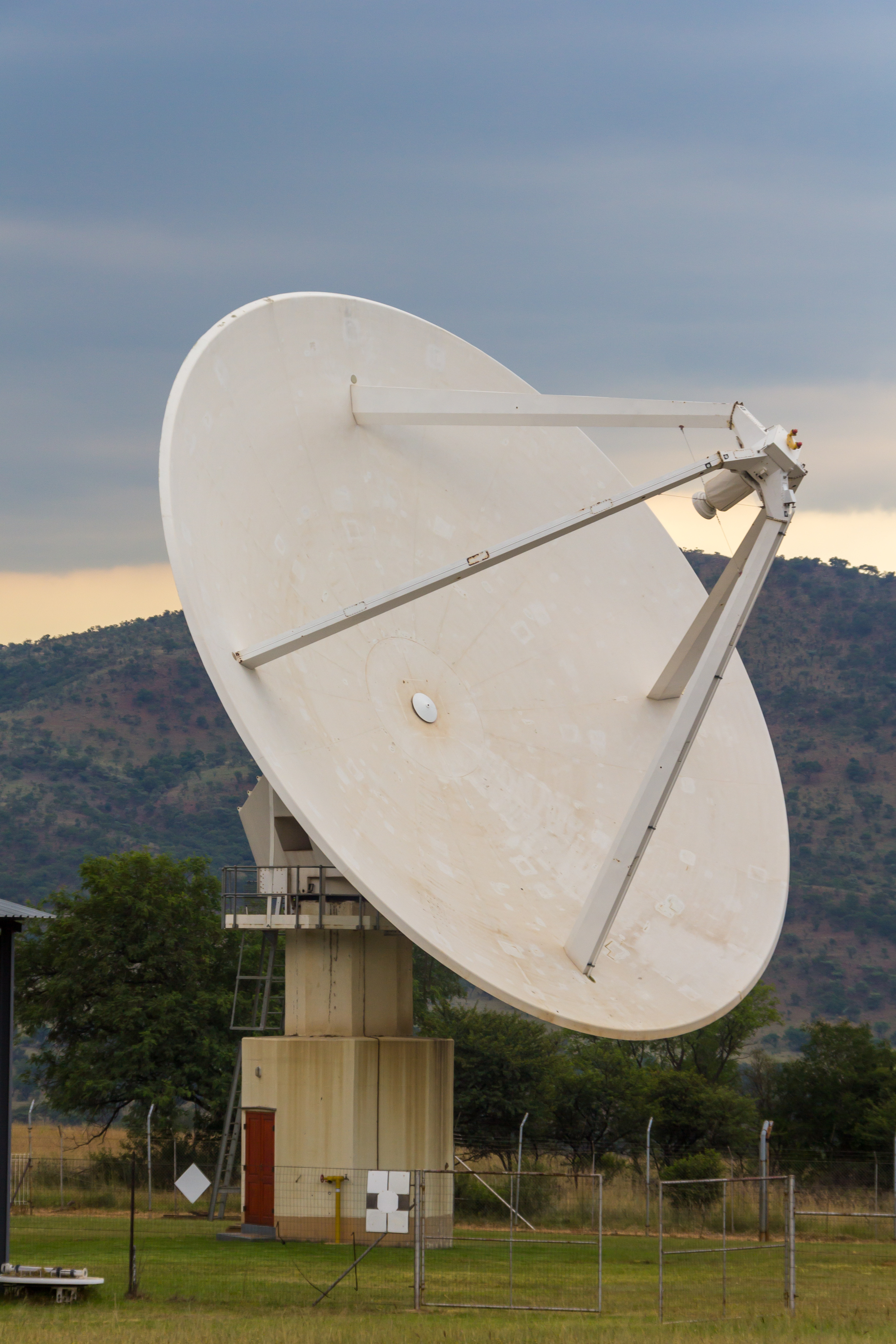
MeerKAT prototype

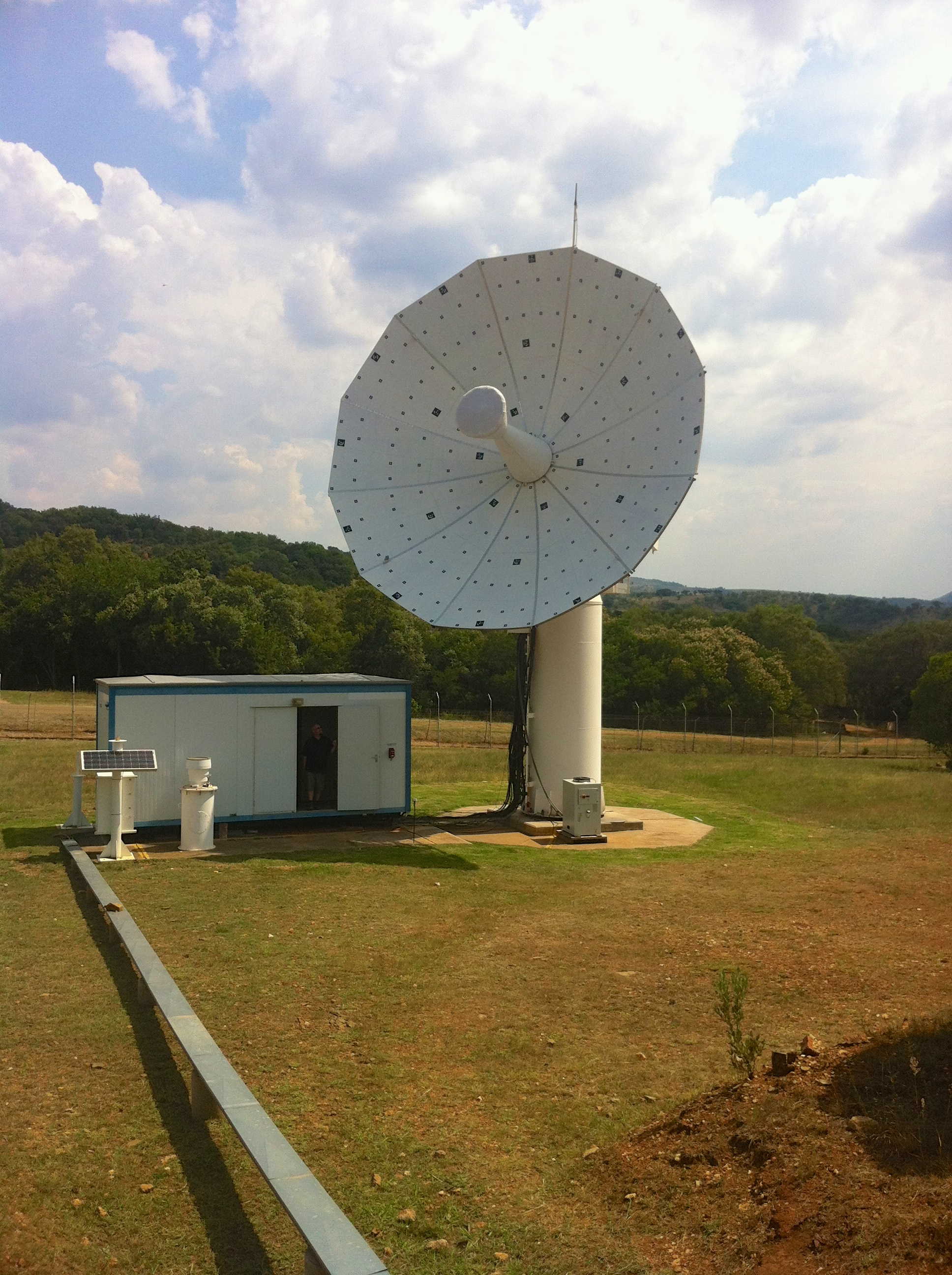
C-BASS South prototype

== See also ==
- National Research Foundation of South Africa
- South African Astronomical Observatory
- Deep Space Network
