= Hydrogen Epoch of Reionization Array =

Low frequency radio telescope in South Africa

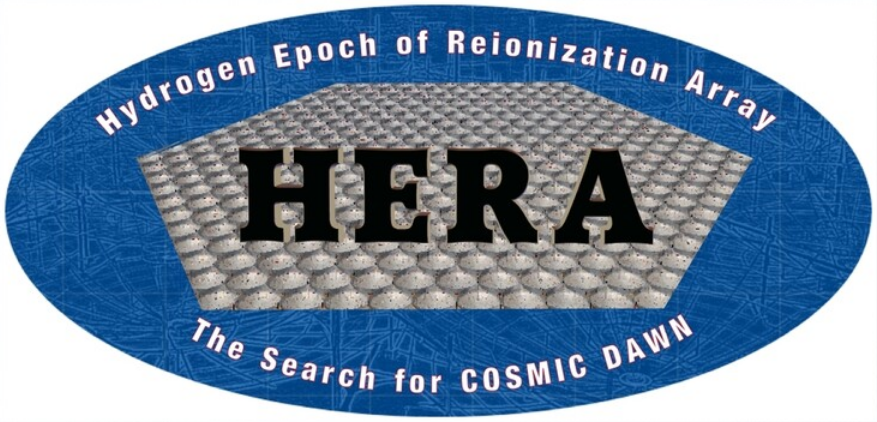
- Alternative names: HERA
- Location(s): South Africa
- Coordinates: 30°43′17″S 21°25′42″E
- Diameter: 14 m (45 ft 11 in)
- Website: reionization.org
- Location of Hydrogen Epoch of Reionization Array
- Related media on Commons

The Hydrogen Epoch of Reionization Array (HERA; Principal Investigator Aaron Parsons) is a radio telescope dedicated to observing large scale structure during and prior to the epoch of reionization. HERA is a Square Kilometre Array (SKA) precursor instrument, intended to observe the early universe and to assist in the design of the full SKA. Along with MeerKAT, also in South Africa, and two radio telescopes in Western Australia, the Australian SKA Pathfinder (ASKAP) and the Murchison Widefield Array (MWA), the HERA is one of four precursors to the final SKA. It is located in the Meerkat National Park.

== Motivation ==
There is a large time interval between the universe's recombination epoch (z=1100) and the time (z = 7±1) after which intergalactic gas is largely reionized. Studies of the cosmic microwave background (CMB) have shown the structure of the universe at the start of this interval, and deep optical surveys such as the Sloan Digital Sky Survey show the structure after this time interval, but there is little data available from the time when the first generation of stars and the earliest black holes were appearing. Since hydrogen was by far the most common element in the early universe, a natural way to examine the epoch when stars appeared is to look at the fraction of hydrogen that is ionized. Astronomers observe cold atomic hydrogen with the 21 cm (1420 MHz) spectral line. Assuming that reionization occurs at z = 6 to 8, one would expect to see this spectral line redshifted into a frequency range around 150 to 200 MHz. A series of instruments such as PAPER, LOFAR and MWA have been looking for this radiation. HERA is a project to look for this radiation with improved sensitivity.

The CMB provides a background screen upon which the hydrogen reionization signal will be seen. Very cold hydrogen gas will absorb CMB photons, and produce a dip in the CMB signal. Warm hydrogen will emit 21 cm (rest frame) photons, increasing the sky brightness above what the CMB provides. After the hydrogen is fully reionized, the CMB will no longer be affected by the 21 cm line transitions of neutral hydrogen. Observing how absorption and emission vary as a function of z, and as a function of sky position, will provide tight constraints on models of the formation of stars, galaxies and supermassive black holes.

== Technical challenges ==
HERA will observe in the frequency band from 50 to 250 MHz. This frequency range includes broadcast signals for FM radio, television, and many other terrestrial sources. These signals will be many orders of magnitude stronger than the signal HERA is searching for, so to minimize this interference HERA is being constructed in the sparsely populated Karoo desert of South Africa, near Carnarvon.

Interference from the Sun also disrupts observations, which restricts observations to night time hours. The galactic plane of the Milky Way also must be avoided. These two constraints limit HERA's science observations to an annual observing window approximately 4 months long.

Another major technical challenge is emission from foreground sources such as quasars and ionized gas within the Milky Way. This emission is expected to be four to five orders of magnitude stronger than the recombination epoch signals HERA will try to detect. However this foreground is composed of synchrotron and free-free emission, which has no narrow spectral features. In contrast HERA's goal is to detect the formation of warm neutral and ionized regions within the intergalactic gas, and those regions should produce narrow spectral features. The HERA array must have a smooth spectral bandpass so that when the foreground emission is subtracted from the detected signal, the remaining narrow features come from the astronomical objects rather than the instrument's spectral response.

== Telescope design ==
HERA is a radio interferometer, cross-correlating the signals from pairs of individual antennas. Radio interferometers intended for imaging are usually designed to minimize the number of identical baselines, in order to measure emission at the largest possible number of spatial frequencies for image reconstruction. In contrast, the antennas in the HERA array are deployed in a hexagonal tiling pattern, which provides a large number of identical baselines. While this geometry reduces the quality of images that HERA can produce, it allows signals from identical baselines to be summed in order to improve the signal to noise ratio.

The individual antennas have a cross-dipole feed suspended above a 14 meter wire mesh parabolic dish. The antennas are not steerable, they point towards the zenith. The size of the antenna was selected to be large enough that any standing waves within the antenna structure would be at frequencies below 50 MHz, outside of the frequency band of interest. The antennas are constructed from low cost materials such as wood and PVC pipes.

When completed, the array will consist of 350 antennas (318 in a densely-packed hexaconal core 300 meters across, and 32 in more distant outriggers). The total collecting area will be 54,000 m², similar to that of Arecibo Observatory.

== Results ==
Because of the large fractional bandwidth of the array (which complicates foreground signal subtraction) and the weakness of the cosmological signal (roughly 10 millikelvin), it is unlikely that HERA will produce high quality images of individual structures within the reionizing gas. Instead, the array will measure the power spectrum of fluctuations in the gas, much as early CMB instruments did.
