= Karl Jordan (zoologist, born 1861) =

German entomologist

Heinrich Ernst Karl Jordan
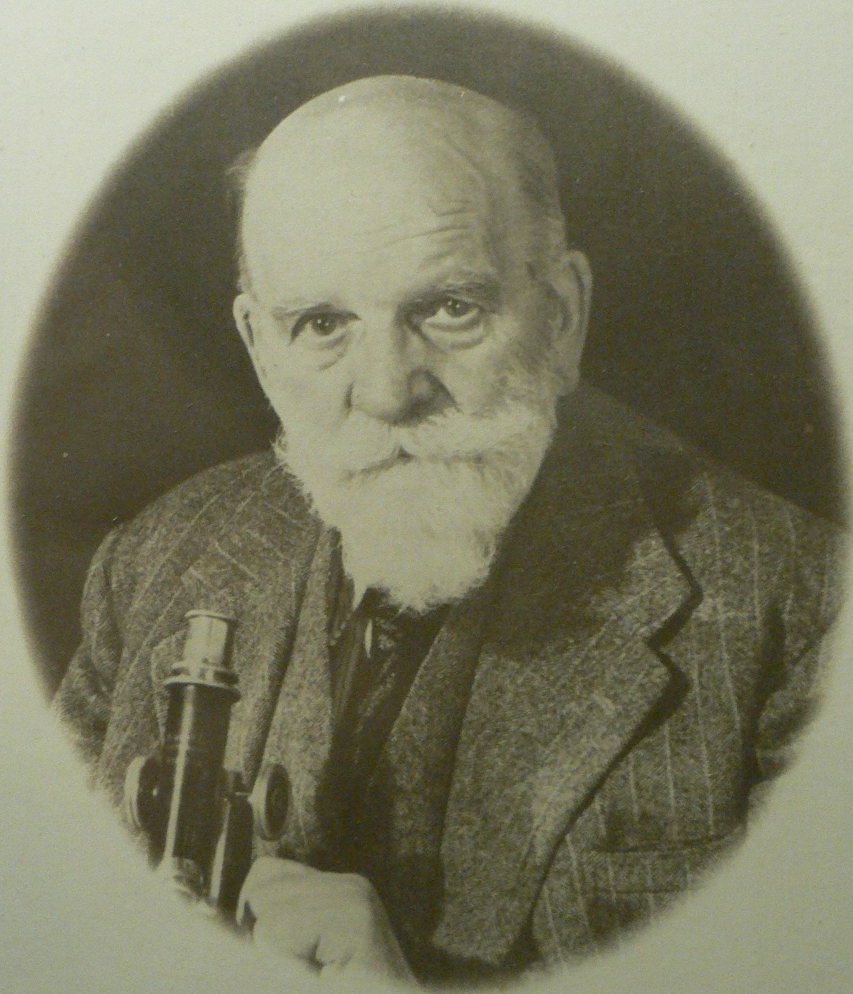
- Born: 7 December 1861
- Died: 12 January 1959 (aged 97)
- Citizenship: United Kingdom
- Spouse: Minna Brünig
- Scientific career
- Fields: Entomology

Heinrich Ernst Karl Jordan (7 December 1861 – 12 January 1959) was a German-British entomologist. He took a special interest in the taxonomy and classification of butterflies, beetles and fleas. Jordan was a founder of the International Congress of Entomology.

== Life and career ==
Jordan was born in a farming family in Almstedt, raised by an uncle after the death of his father in 1855, finished school in Hildesheim and educated at Göttingen University. After a year of military service, he taught at Münden Grammar School for five years and came in contact with zoologist August Metzger and Count Berlepsch that led to a growth in his natural history interest. Through their recommendation he received an invitation to join Ernst Hartert at Rothschild's museum. In 1893 he began work at Walter Rothschild's Natural History Museum at Tring, specialising in Coleoptera, Lepidoptera and Siphonaptera. Jordan published over 400 papers, many jointly with Charles and Walter Rothschild. He described 2,575 new species himself, with an additional 851 in collaboration with the Rothschilds.

Jordan married Minna Brünig in 1891, who he knew from a young age.

Jordan initiated and founded the first International Entomological Congress, held in 1910 after being inspired by the zoological congresses that he attended at Berlin and Cambridge. He became a naturalized British citizen in 1911. Jordan was a fellow of the Royal Society, and president of the Entomological Society of London from 1929 to 1930.

== Legacy ==
Jordan is commemorated in the scientific name of a species of African lizard, Karusasaurus jordani.

In 1972, the Lepidopterists' Society began to award the Karl Jordan Medal in his honour.

== Sources ==
- Rothschild, Miriam (1983). Dear Lord Rothschild: Birds, Butterflies and History. London: Hutchinson. 398 pp. ISBN 0-09-153740-1.
- Johnson, Kristin (2012). Ordering Life: Karl Jordan and the Naturalist Tradition Baltimore: Johns Hopkins University Press. viii + 376 pp. ISBN 978-1-4214-0600-8 (hardcover), ISBN 978-1-4214-0650-3 (electronic). ISBN 1-4214-0600-4 (hardcover), ISBN 1-4214-0650-0 (electronic).
