= Karusasaurus jordani =

Jordan's girdled lizard

Conservation status
- Least Concern (IUCN 3.1)

Scientific classification
- Kingdom: Animalia
- Phylum: Chordata
- Class: Reptilia
- Order: Squamata
- Family: Cordylidae
- Genus: Karusasaurus
- Species: K. jordani

Binomial name
- Karusasaurus jordani (Parker, 1936)

Synonyms
- Zonurus jordani Parker, 1936; Cordylus jordani — FitzSimons, 1943; Cordylus polyzonus jordani — Loveridge, 1944; Cordylus jordani — Branch, 1988; Karusasaurus jordani — Stanley et al., 2011

Species of lizard

Karusasaurus jordani, also known commonly as Jordan's girdled lizard and the Namibian girdled lizard, is a species of small, spiny lizard in the family Cordylidae. The species is endemic to Namibia.

== Etymology ==
The specific name, jordani, is in honor of German-born British entomologist Heinrich Ernst Karl Jordan.

== Geographic range ==
K. jordani is found in central Namibia.

== Habitat ==
The preferred natural habitat of K. jordani is rocky hillsides in savanna, at altitudes of 1,000–1,800 m (3,300–5,900 ft).

== Description ==
Adults of K. jordani usually have a snout-to-vent length (SVL) of 11–12 cm (4.3–4.7 in), and maximum recorded SVL is 12.7 cm (5.0 in). The body is robust, not flattened. Adults are uniformly olive-brown, but juveniles are buff with dark crossbars. Males have only 5–8 femoral pores.

== Reproduction ==
The mode of reproduction of K. jordani has been described as viviparous and as ovoviviparous.
