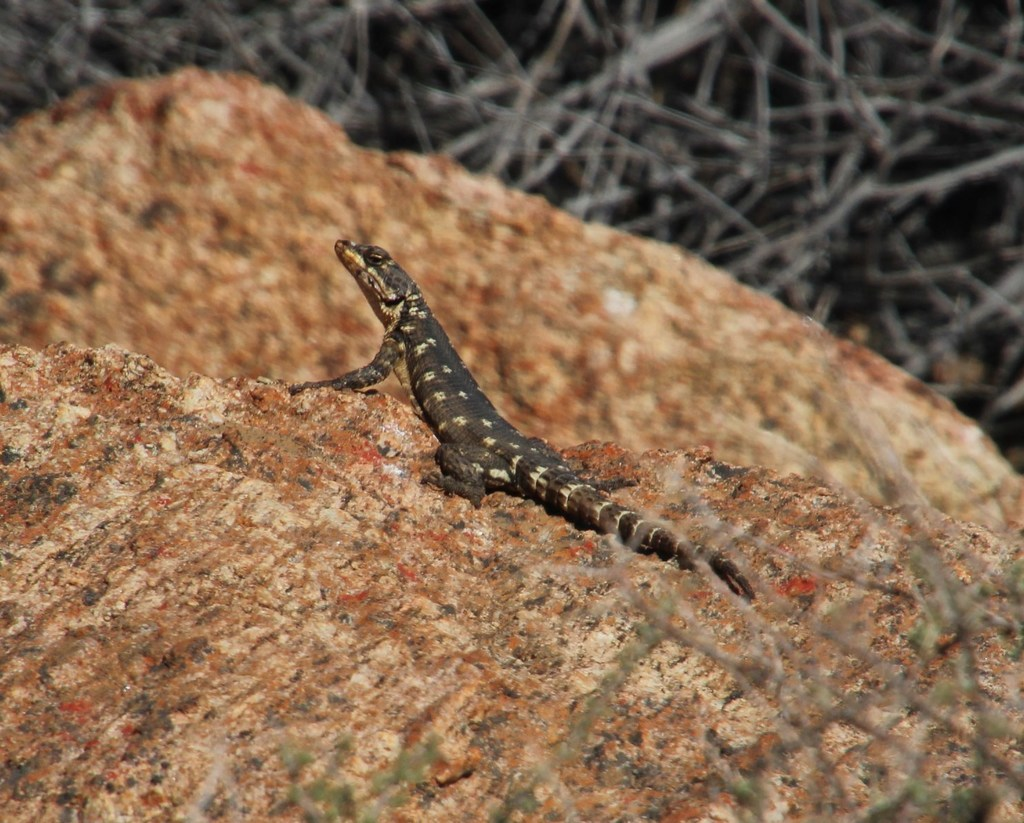

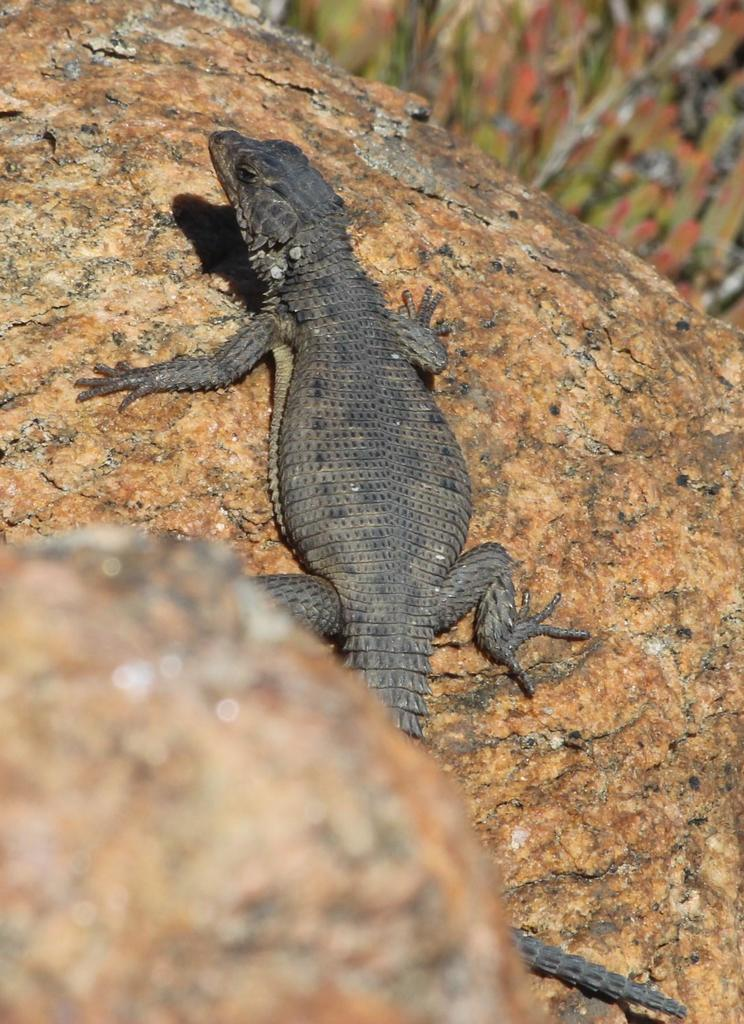

Conservation status
- Least Concern (IUCN 3.1)

Scientific classification
- Kingdom: Animalia
- Phylum: Chordata
- Class: Reptilia
- Order: Squamata
- Suborder: Scinciformata
- Infraorder: Scincomorpha
- Family: Cordylidae
- Genus: Karusasaurus
- Species: K. polyzonus

Binomial name
- Karusasaurus polyzonus (Smith, 1838)

Synonyms
- Cordylus polyzonus Smith, 1838; Zonurus polyzonus Smith, 1838

= Karusasaurus polyzonus =

Species of lizard

Karusasaurus polyzonus, commonly known as the Karoo girdled lizard or the southern karusa lizard, is a species of lizard in the family Cordylidae.

== Etymology ==
Karusasaurus, the genus name, is derived from the Khosian word "Karusa" and the Latinized Greek word "saurus." Karusa translates to "dry" or "barren," and "saurus" translates to "lizard."

== Description ==
The Karoo girdled lizard is a rather large species. Its distance from its snout to its cloaca (known as snout-to-vent length) is roughly 120 millimeters, which is nearly 5 inches. It has osteoderms distributed throughout its body. It varies greatly in color – specimens range from black, red, to turquoise. Individuals can also be spotted.

== Distribution and ecology ==
The Karoo girdled lizard is a common species, distributed throughout the southern part of Africa. Specifically, it occurs in Southern Namibia, and most of South Africa. Specimens have also been recorded in other nearby areas, but these have not been confirmed. It covers an area of almost 150,000 square kilometers in total.

The Karoo girdled lizard almost always dwells in rocky areas – besides that, their habitat varies somewhat. It occurs at lower elevations – specimens have been found mostly in lowland areas as well as on the lower slopes of mountains.

This lizard species is ovoviviparous, which means that the eggs the embryos are in stay inside their mother's body until they are ready to hatch. Its generation time is over a year, which is known as semivoltinism. It is diurnal, and is dormant during certain seasons. Like Karusasaurus jordani, it is an insectivore.
