= Aaron Parsons =

American astrophysicist

- Born: 1980 (age 45–46); Colorado, USA
- Education: Harvard University; UC Berkeley
- Scientific career
- Fields: Radio Astronomy, cosmology
- Workplaces: UC Berkeley
- Doctoral advisor: Donald Backer
- Website: https://aaronrparsons.com

Aaron R. Parsons (born 1980) is an American astrophysicist who works primarily in the fields of radio astronomy instrumentation and experimental cosmology.

== Biography ==
Parsons was born in 1980. He grew up in Rangely, Colorado and graduated simultaneously from high school and from Colorado Northwestern Community College with an AS degree in 1998. He majored in physics and mathematics at Harvard University, and graduated with a BA in 2002. After working as a development engineer at the UC Berkeley Space Sciences Lab from 2002 to 2004, Parsons entered graduate school at the University of California, Berkeley in astronomy, receiving his PhD in 2009 while holding a predoctoral research position at Arecibo Observatory in Puerto Rico. Parsons returned to UC Berkeley on an NSF postdoctoral fellowship in 2009. He was hired as an assistant professor in the Astronomy Department and in the Radio Astronomy Laboratory at UC Berkeley in 2011.

== Research ==
Parsons is the principal investigator of the Hydrogen Epoch of Reionization Array and the Precision Array for Probing the Epoch of Reionization (PAPER) array, a radio interferometer designed to detect the first era of star formation, commonly called the Epoch of Reionization, via its effect on hydrogen in the intergalactic medium. He specializes in digital signal processing instrumentation, and was one of the founding members of the Center for Astronomy Signal Processing and Electronics Research (CASPER).

== Creative Works ==
=== Coherence (2025) ===
Parsons published his first book, the novel Coherence, on December 8, 2025 with EoR Publishing. The book follows the protagonist Ruby, a graduate student in a Boston-area physics program, as she navigates a web of lies woven by humans and an artificially intelligent agent dubbed MiddleMan. As the lies compound, she is drawn into conflict with her advisor Mendel, her boyfriend Noah, and the exploitative systems surrounding her. Noah, as a co-developer of MiddleMan, struggles with the ethics of manipulating public perception to address climate change even as the project spirals in scope with unintended consequences for Ruby's personal life and civilization as a whole. The novel ends with a revelation that recasts the interpretation of many of the computer-styled, unattributed conversations in the book.

== Honors ==
- Charles Townes Fellow (2008)
- NSF Astronomy & Astrophysics Fellow (2009)
- Mary Elizabeth Uhl Prize (2009)
- Presidential Early Career Award for Scientists and Engineers (2019)
