= MeerKAT =

64-antenna radio telescope in South Africa

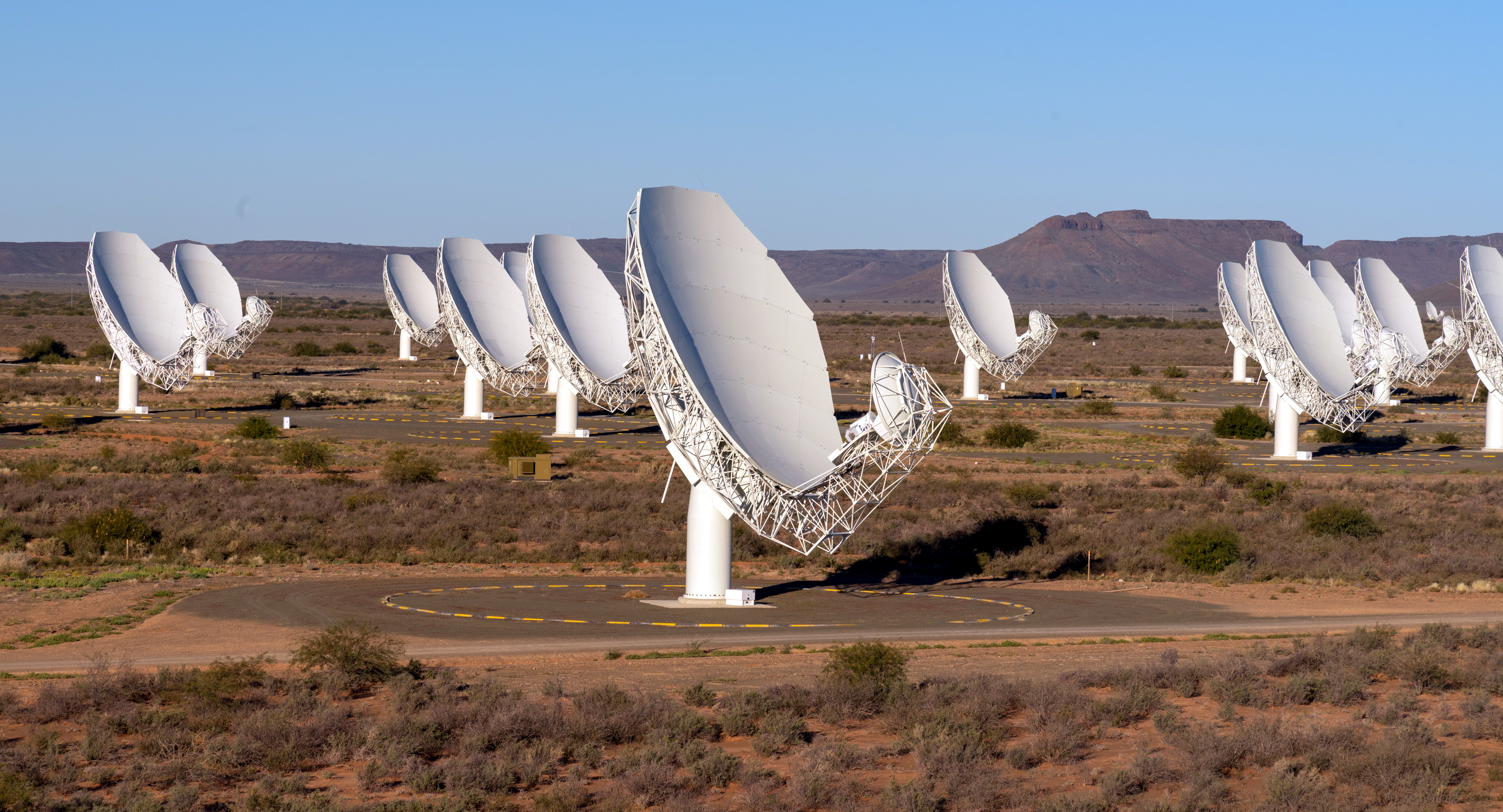
- Alternative names: Karoo Array Telescope
- Location: Meerkat National Park, Karoo Hoogland Local Municipality, Namakwa District Municipality, Northern Cape, RSA
- Coordinates: 30°42′48″S 21°26′35″E
- Wavelength: 3 cm (10.0 GHz)–30 cm (1,000 MHz)
- Diameter: 13.5 m (44 ft 3 in)
- Collecting area: 9,000 m^{2} (97,000 sq ft)
- Website: www.sarao.ac.za
- Location within South Africa
- Related media on Commons

MeerKAT, originally the Karoo Array Telescope, is a radio telescope consisting of 64 antennas in the Meerkat National Park, in the Northern Cape of South Africa. In 2003, South Africa submitted an expression of interest to host the Square Kilometre Array (SKA) Radio Telescope in Africa, and the locally designed and built MeerKAT was incorporated into the first phase of the SKA. MeerKAT was launched in 2018. MeerKAT is located inside a radio quiet zone within the park.

Along with the Hydrogen Epoch of Reionization Array (HERA), also in South Africa, and two radio telescopes in Western Australia, the Australian SKA Pathfinder (ASKAP) and the Murchison Widefield Array (MWA), the MeerKAT is one of four precursors to the final SKA.

== History ==
MeerKAT was originally planned to contain 20 receptors, and was known as the Karoo Array Telescope. However, the South African government increased the budget to allow for 64 receptors, which prompted the rename to MeerKAT, meaning “more of KAT”.

Construction of the 64-dish MeerKAT array took place from 2014 to 2018 and was one of the largest scientific projects in South Africa. The telescope was officially inaugurated by Deputy President David Mabuza on July 13, 2018. In 2023, the MeerKAT team were awarded the Royal Astronomical Society's 2023 Group Achievement Award because of breakthrough observations in just a short period of operation, including large-scale radio bubbles around Sagittarius A, and radio afterglow from a neutron star merger event.

The MeerKAT is a precursor for the Square Kilometer Array (SKA) telescope, as are the Hydrogen Epoch of Reionization Array (HERA), the Australian SKA Pathfinder (ASKAP) and the Murchison Widefield Array (MWA). MeerKAT will be incorporated into SKA-Mid, a 197-dish array.

== Description ==
It is located on the SKA site in the Karoo, and is a pathfinder for SKA-mid technologies and science. It was designed by engineers within the South Africa Radio Astronomy Observatory and South African industries, and most of the hardware and software was sourced in South Africa. It comprises 64 antennas, each 13.5m in diameter, equipped with cryogenic receivers. The antennas have positions for four receivers, and one of the three vacant positions will be filled by S-band receivers provided by the Max Planck Institute for Radio Astronomy (MPIfR). The array configuration has 61% of the antennas located within a 1 km diameter circle, and the remaining 39% distributed out to a radius of 4 km.

The receiver outputs are digitised immediately at the antenna, and the digital data streams are transported to the Karoo Array Processor Building (KAPB) via buried optical fibres. The antenna signals are processed by the Correlator/Beamformer (CBF) digital signal processor. Data from the CBF is passed on to the Science Processor computer cluster and disk storage modules. The MeerKAT antenna data is also made available to a number of user-supplied digital backends via the CBF, including pulsar and fast radio burst (FRB) search engines, a precision pulsar timing system, and a SETI signal processor. A time and frequency reference (TFR) system provides clock and absolute time signals required by the digitisers and other telescope subsystems. This TFR system comprises two hydrogen maser clocks, two rubidium atomic clocks, a precise crystal oscillator, and a set of GNSS receiver systems for time transfer with UTC.

The massive computing and digital signal-processing systems located at the KAPB are housed in a large shielded chamber (or Faraday cage) to prevent radio signals from the equipment interfering with the sensitive radio receivers. The KAPB itself is partially buried below ground level to provide additional radio frequency interference (RFI) protection, and to provide temperature stability. The KAPB also houses a power conditioning facility for the entire site, including three diesel rotary UPS units that provide an uninterrupted power supply to the whole site.

A long-haul optical fibre transfers data from the KAPB to the Centre for High Performance Computing (CHPC) and SARAO office in Cape Town, and provides a control and monitoring link to the SARAO operations centre in Cape Town. Telescope data processing and reduction is executed on compute facilities provided by the MeerKAT SP systems, and on other high performance computer facilities provides by MeerKAT users.

== Specifications ==
MeerKAT inaugurated in July 2018 consists of 64 dishes of 13.5 metres in diameter each with an offset Gregorian configuration. An offset dish configuration has been chosen because its unblocked aperture provides uncompromised optical performance and sensitivity, excellent imaging quality and good rejection of unwanted radio frequency interference from satellites and terrestrial transmitters. It also facilitates the installation of multiple receiver systems in the primary and secondary focal areas and is the reference design for the mid-band SKA concept.

MeerKAT supports a wide range of observing modes, including deep continuum, polarisation and spectral line imaging, pulsar timing and transient searches. A range of standard data products are provided, including an imaging pipeline. A number of "data spigots" are also available to support user-provided instrumentation. Significant design and qualification efforts are planned to ensure high reliability to achieve low operational cost and high availability.

Specifications
Number of antennae	64
Dish diameter	13.5 m
Minimum baseline	29 m
Maximum baseline	8 km
Frequency bands (receivers)	0.58 – 1.015 GHz; 0.9 - 1.67 GHz; 8 – 14.5 GHz
Continuum imaging dynamic range at 1.4 GHz	60 dB
Line-to-line dynamic range at 1.4 GHz	40 dB
Mosaicing imaging dynamic range at 1.4 GHz	27 dB
Linear polarisation cross coupling across −3 dB beam	−30 dB

MeerKAT's 64 dishes are distributed over two components:

- A dense inner component containing 70% of the dishes. These are distributed in a two-dimensional fashion with a Gaussian distribution with a mean dispersion of 300 m, a shortest baseline of 29 m and a longest baseline of 1 km.
- An outer component containing 30% of the dishes. These are also distributed in a two-dimensional Gaussian distribution with a mean dispersion of 2,500 m and a longest baseline of 8 km.

== Construction schedule ==
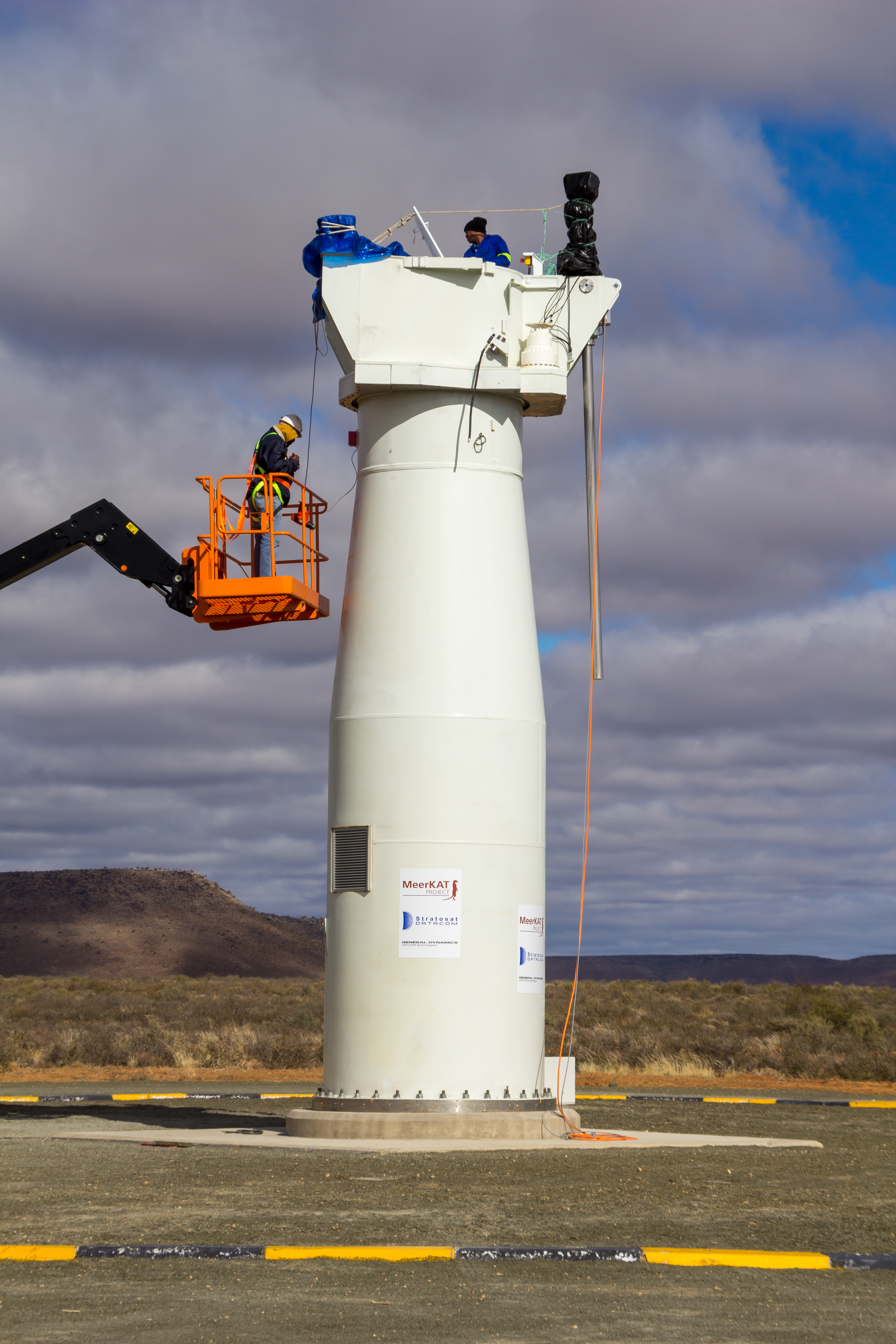
The pedestal of the first MeerKAT telescope in 2014

To acquire experience in the construction of interferometric telescopes, members of the Karoo Array Telescope constructed the Phased Experimental Demonstrator (PED) at the South African Astronomical Observatory in Cape Town between 2005 and 2007.

During 2007, the 15 metres (49 ft) eXperimental Development Model Telescope (XDM) was built at the Hartebeesthoek Radio Astronomy Observatory to serve as a testbed for MeerKAT.

Construction of the MeerKAT Precursor Array (MPA – also known as KAT-7), on the site started in August 2009. In April 2010 four of the seven first dishes were linked together as an integrated system to produce its first interferometric image of an astronomical object. In Dec 2010, there was a successful detection of very long baseline interferometry (VLBI) fringes between the Hartebeesthoek Radio Astronomy Observatory 26 m dish and one of the KAT-7 dishes.

Despite original plans to complete MeerKAT by 2012, construction was suspended in late 2010 due to budget restructure. Science Minister Naledi Pandor denied the suspension marked any setback to the SKA project or 'external considerations'. MeerKAT construction received no funding in 2010/11 and 2011/12. The 2012 South African National Budget projected that just 15 MeerKAT antennas would be completed by 2015.

The last of the reinforced concrete foundations for the MeerKAT antennas was completed on 11 February 2014. Almost 5000 m^{3} of concrete and over 570 tonnes of steel were used to build the 64 bases over a 9-month period.

MeerKAT is planned to be completed in three phases. The first phase will include all the antennas but only the first receiver will be fitted. A processing bandwidth of 750 MHz is available. For the second and third phases, the remaining two receivers will be fitted and the processing bandwidth will be increased to at least 2 GHz, with a goal of 4 GHz. With construction of all sixty-four MeerKAT antennas complete, verification tests have begun to ensure the instruments are functioning correctly. Following this, MeerKAT will be commissioned in the second half of 2018 with the array then coming online for science operations.

== Inauguration ==
On 13 July 2018, the Deputy President of South Africa, David Mabuza, inaugurated the MeerKAT Telescope, and unveiled an image produced by MeerKAT that revealed unprecedented detail of the region surrounding the supermassive black hole at the centre of our Milky Way Galaxy.

The 64 MeerKAT antennas will be incorporated into Phase 1 of the SKA Mid Frequency Array once the 133 SKA dishes have been built and commissioned on the Karoo site, resulting in a total of 197 antennas for the SKA array. All of the infrastructure currently associated with MeerKAT will be transferred to the SKA array. The KAPB has the capacity to house the additional equipment required by SKA Mid.

MeerKAT Phasing schedule
	2011 Precursor (KAT-7)	2016 MeerKAT Phase 1	2018 MeerKAT Phase 2 and 3
Number of dishes	7	64	64
Receiver bands (GHz)	0.9 – 1.6	1.00 – 1.75	0.58 – 1.015; 0.9 - 1.67; 8 – 14.5
Max processed BW (GHz)	0.256	0.75	2 (goal 4)
Max baseline (km)	0.2	8	20
Min baseline (m)	20	29	29

== Science objectives ==
The science objectives of the MeerKAT surveys are in line with the prime science drivers for the first phase of the SKA, confirming MeerKAT's designation as an SKA precursor instrument. Five years of observing time on MeerKAT have been allocated to leading astronomers who have applied for time to do research.

== Site ==
The South African Department of Science and Technology, through the NRF and SARAO, has invested more than R760 million in infrastructure on the South African SKA site. The innovative design and engineering of the infrastructure established for MeerKAT, as well as the RFI-quiet environment, favourable physical site characteristics, and on-site technical expertise has positioned the site in the Karoo as an ideal location for other radio astronomy experiments.

The HERA (Hydrogen Epoch of Reionisation Array) radio telescope is one such instrument co-located at the South African SKA site. HERA is designed to detect, for the first time, radio signals from the very first stars and galaxies that formed early in the life of the universe. South African engineers and scientists are working with their colleagues at the University of California Berkeley in the US, and Cambridge University in the UK, to build HERA and exploit its unique and fundamental scientific capabilities.

Other experiments which have been constructed at the SA SKA site include PAPER (the Precision Array for Probing the Epoch of Reionization) and the C-BASS (the C-Band All Sky Survey).

To ensure long term viability of the Karoo site for the MeerKAT and the SKA, and for other radio astronomy instruments, the South African Parliament passed the Astronomy Geographic Advantage Act, in 2007. The act gives the Minister of Science and Technology the authority to protect areas, through regulations, that are of strategic national importance for astronomy and related scientific endeavours.

== Discoveries ==
In September 2019, an international team of astronomers using South Africa’s MeerKAT radio telescope discovered enormous balloon-like structures that tower hundreds of light-years above and below the centre of our galaxy.

== South Africa and SKA science and technology ==
The experience gained by South African engineers in the design and construction of MeerKAT had been carried over to the SKA design, reducing risks and development costs. South African engineers within SARAO and South African industrial partners have participated in 7 of the 11 SKA engineering design consortia, contributing about 10% of the workforce in these internationally distributed consortia. The Infrastructure South Africa Consortium and the Assembly, Integration, Verification (AIV) Consortium have been led by SARAO, and there was South African participation in the DISH Consortium, Science Data Processor (SDP) Consortium, the Signal and Data Transport (SaDT Consortium), the Telescope Manager (TM) Consortium and the Mid-frequency Aperture Array Consortium. South African engineers have overseen the system engineering aspects of 5 of the consortia. SARAO has signed an MoU with the SKAO to provide resources to the Bridging Activities that will continue the development of SKA subsystems now that the consortia have concluded their work. Participation by South African industrial partners in previous consortium work and future Bridging Activities is facilitated by SARAO through the Financial Assistance Programme (FAP) funding initiative.

Scientists from SARAO and South African universities are well represented on the various SKA Science Working Groups (SWGs), with about 10% of the authors of papers in the SKA Science Book having South African institution affiliations. The MeerKAT Large Science Projects (LSPs) are closely aligned with the SKA science case, and there is a large membership overlap between the LSP teams and the associated SWGs.

== Capacity development for radio astronomy in Africa ==
To create the required skills to design, construct and operate the SKA and MeerKAT telescopes, and to make optimal use of these radio telescopes for research, once commissioned, SARAO initiated a capacity development programme, in 2005. The programme is fully integrated into the operations of SARAO, and it is crafted to develop and retain the researchers, engineers and artisans required to ensure that the MeerKAT and SKA will be successful in South Africa. To date the programme has provided more than 1000 scholarships and fellowships across all relevant academic levels, and for a range of relevant qualifications. The programme is coveted by academic colleagues from abroad because of its success in developing, from a low base, significant expertise in radio astronomy over the past 14 years.

Science projects	Research leaders
Testing Einstein's theory of gravity and gravitational radiation – Investigating the physics of enigmatic neutron stars through observations of pulsars.	Prof Matthew Bailes, Swinburne Centre for Astrophysics and Supercomputing, Australia
LADUMA (Looking at the Distant Universe with the MeerKAT Array) – An ultra-deep survey of neutral hydrogen gas in the early universe.	Dr Sarah Blyth, University of Cape Town, South Africa; Dr Benne Holwerda, European Space Agency, The Netherlands; Dr Andrew Baker, Rutgers University, United States
MESMER (MeerKAT Search for Molecules in the Epoch of Reionization) – Searching for CO at high red-shift (z>7) to investigate the role of molecular hydrogen in the early universe.	Dr Ian Heywood, University of Oxford, United Kingdom
MeerKAT Absorption Line Survey for atomic hydrogen and OH lines in absorption against distant continuum sources (OH line ratios may give clues about changes in the fundamental constants in the early universe).	Dr Neeraj Gupta, ASTRON, The Netherlands; Dr Raghunathan Srianand, Inter-University Centre for Astronomy and Astrophysics, India
MHONGOOSE (MeerKAT HI Observations of Nearby Galactic Objects: Observing Southern Emitters) – Investigations of different types of galaxies, dark matter and the cosmic web.	Prof Erwin de Blok, University of Cape Town, South Africa
TRAPUM (Transients and Pulsars with MeerKAT) – Searching for and investigating new and exotic pulsars.	Dr Benjamin Stappers, Jodrell Bank Centre for Astrophysics, United Kingdom; Prof Michael Kramer, Max Planck Institute for Radio Astronomy, Germany
A MeerKAT HI Survey of the Fornax Cluster (Galaxy formation and evolution in the cluster environment).	Dr Paolo Serra, ASTRON, The Netherlands
MeerGAL (MeerKAT High Frequency Galactic Plane Survey) – Galactic structure and dynamics, distribution of ionised gas, recombination lines, interstellar molecular gas and masers.	Dr Mark Thompson, University of Hertfordshire, United Kingdom; Dr Sharmila Goedhart, SKA South Africa, South Africa
MIGHTEE (MeerKAT International GigaHertz Tiered Extragalactic Exploration survey) – Deep continuum observations of the earliest radio galaxies.	Dr Kurt van der Heyden, University of Cape Town, South Africa; Dr Matt Jarvis, University of the Western Cape, South Africa and the University of Hertfordshire, United Kingdom
ThunderKAT (The Hunt for Dynamic and Explosive Radio Transients with MeerKAT) – e.g. gamma-ray bursts, novae and supernovae, plus new types of transient radio sources.	Prof Patrick Woudt, University of Cape Town, South Africa; Prof Rob Fender, University of Southampton, United Kingdom
Breakthrough Listen Search for Intelligent Life, commensal survey – e.g. SETI.	Dr. Andrew Siemion, Berkeley SETI Research Center University of California, Berkeley, United States

== African Very Long Baseline Interferometry Network (AVN) ==
The African Very Long Baseline Interferometry (VLBI) Network (AVN) is an important development towards building SKA on the African Continent. The AVN programme will transfer skills and knowledge in the SKA African partner countries (Botswana, Ghana, Kenya, Madagascar, Mauritius, Mozambique, Namibia, and Zambia) to build, maintain, operate and use radio telescopes.

MeerKAT will also participate in global VLBI operations with all major radio astronomy observatories around the world and will add considerably to the sensitivity of the global VLBI network. Further potential science objectives for MeerKAT are to participate in the search for extraterrestrial intelligence and collaborate with NASA on downloading information from space probes.

== See also ==
- Australian Square Kilometre Array Pathfinder
- Hartebeesthoek Radio Astronomy Observatory
- Karoo
- List of radio telescopes
- Precision Array for Probing the Epoch of Reionization
- South African Astronomical Observatory for optical astronomy in South Africa
- Square Kilometer Array
