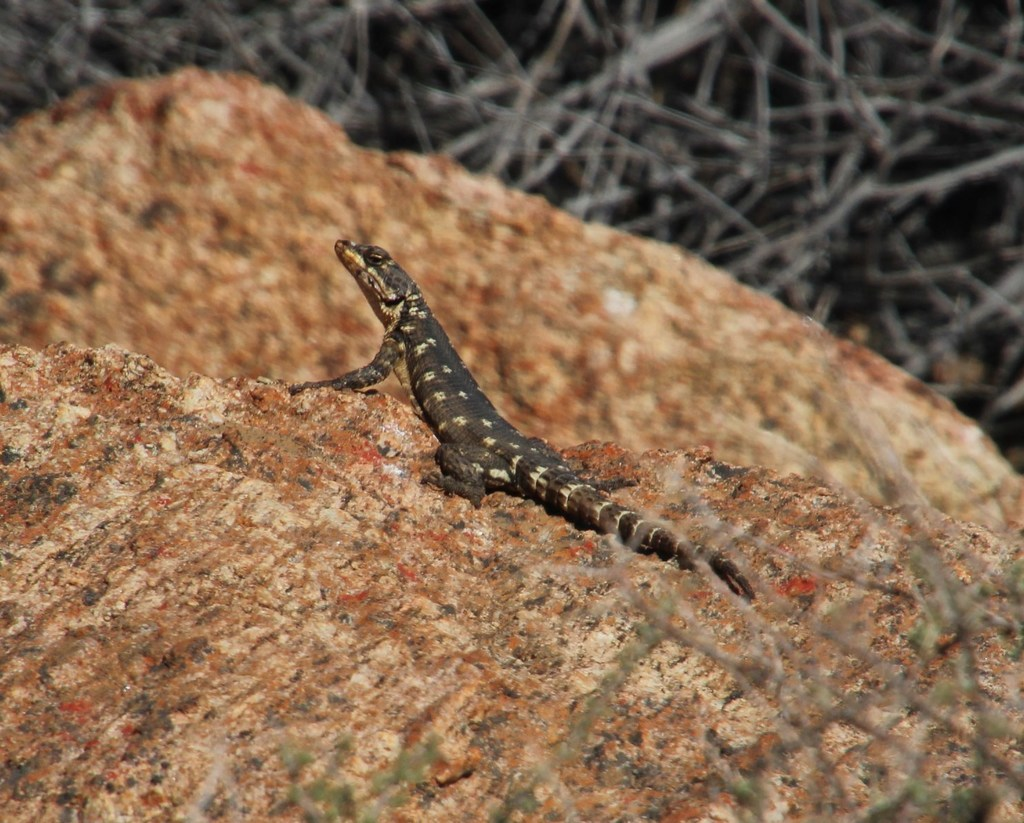
- Karusasaurus polyzonus in its natural habitat
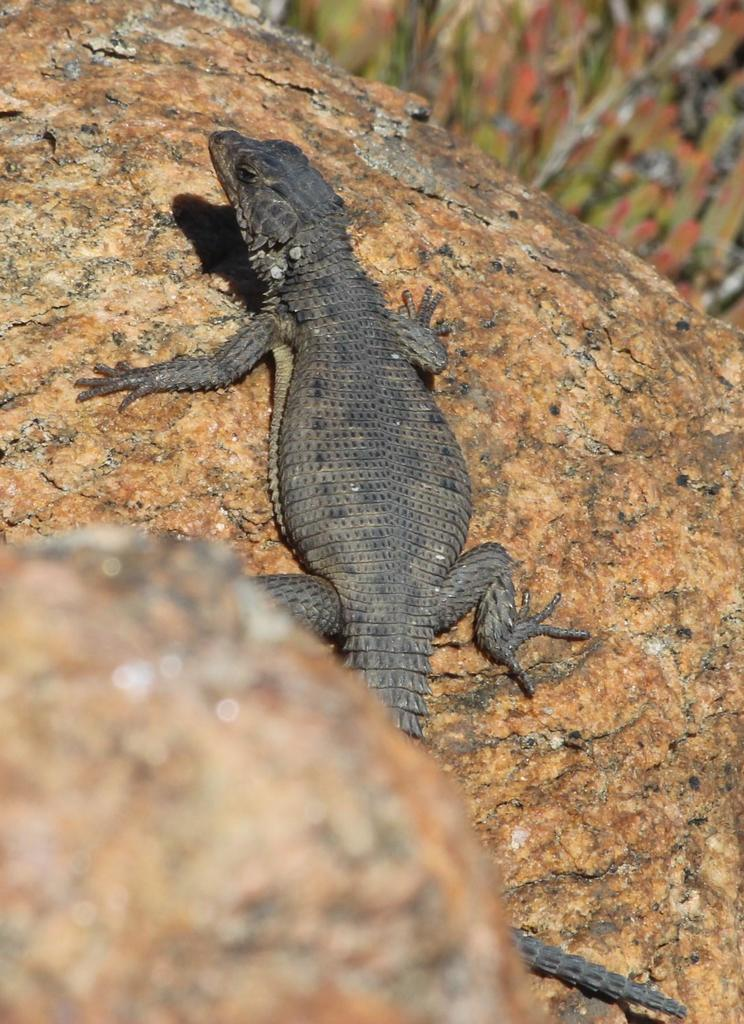
- A more detailed close-up of K. polyzonus

Scientific classification
- Kingdom: Animalia
- Phylum: Chordata
- Class: Reptilia
- Order: Squamata
- Family: Cordylidae
- Genus: Karusasaurus; Stanley, Bauer, Jackman, Branch & Mouton, 2011

Species
- Two, see text

= Karusasaurus =

Genus of lizards

Karusasaurus, commonly known as Karusa lizards or Karusa girdled lizards, is a genus of lizards in the family Cordylidae.

Its species were previously considered to be included in the genus Cordylus, but more recent studies have shown that they are distinct enough to have their own genus.

== Description and distribution ==
Karusasaurus contains two species, which are widely distributed across the southern part of Africa, specifically, in the semi-arid areas of South Africa and Namibia. Like all girdled lizards, they are insectivores. They come in a great range of colors, including black, red, and turquoise.

== Species ==
There are two recognized species:

- Karusasaurus jordani (Parker, 1936) – Jordan's girdled lizard, Namibian girdled lizard
- Karusasaurus polyzonus (A. Smith, 1838) – Karoo girdled lizard, southern Karusa lizard

Nota bene: A binomial authority in parentheses indicates that the species was originally described in a genus other than Karusasaurus.
