= Meerkat National Park =

National park in the Northern Cape, South Africa

- IUCN category II (national park)
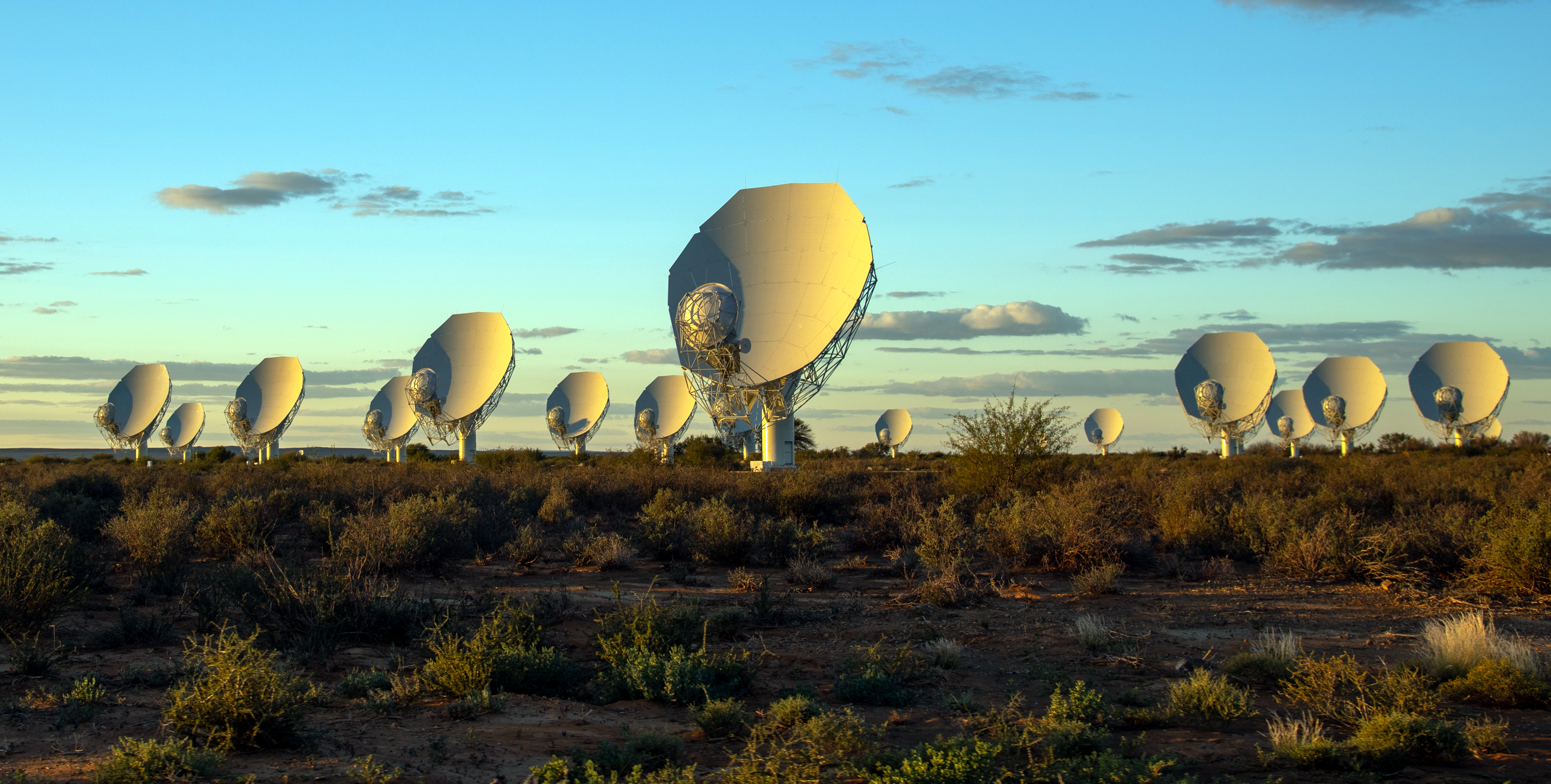
- Location: Karoo Hoogland and Kareeberg municipalities, Northern Cape, South Africa
- Nearest city: Carnarvon
- Coordinates: 30°41′29.2″S 21°23′24.0″E
- Area: 135,245 hectares (1,352.45 km^{2})
- Designated: 27 March 2020; 6 years ago
- Owner: National Research Foundation; South African Astronomical Observatory
- Administrator: South African National Parks
- Meerkat National Park (South Africa)

Meerkat National Park is a large National Park in the Northern Cape, South Africa, that encompasses the Square Kilometre Array's MeerKAT, PAPER and HERA telescopes.

The park only allows visitors on preselect days during the year.

== History ==
The National Research Foundation purchased privately owned rangeland, removed livestock from the area and placed it under the protection of SANParks. In 2020, this park was declared in partnership with the National Research Foundation and the Square Kilometre Array project. It added 3.4% to South Africa's national parks.

== Objectives ==
In addition to hosting the Square Kilometre Array and other astronomical research projects, the National Research Foundation's South African Environmental Observation Network will seek to study large-scale management and long-term environmental research of the area, and the impact of climate change on the local ecosystem.

One of the objectives in creating the park was to increase the protection range of three unprotected ecoregions, including the Nama Karoo ecoregion from 1.5% to 2%; and in doing so, conserve the vulnerable quiver tree forests and other threatened species in the region.

=== Regulation ===
To ensure long term viability of the Karoo site for the Square Kilometre Array project and other radio astronomy instruments, the Parliament of South Africa passed the Astronomy Geographic Advantage Act, 2007. The act gives the Minister of Science and Technology the authority to protect areas, through regulations, that are of strategic national importance for astronomy and related scientific endeavours.

== Ecology ==
After declaring the park, a number of steps were taken to rehabilitate the land, including the removal of livestock, fences and copses of alien mesquite; this saw an increase in wildlife numbers. The park has a healthy population of quiver trees.

=== Vegetation types ===
The park comprises five types of vegetation, namely Bushmanland Basin Shrubland, an aquatic type zone called Bushmanland Vloere, Northern Upper Karoo, Upper Karoo Hardeveld, and Western Upper Karoo vegetation.

223 plant species were documented in the park.

Night time lapse of the MeerKAT telescopes

== Biodiversity ==
There are 29 species of herpetofauna in the park (6 amphibians and 23 reptiles).

=== Amphibians ===
- African bullfrog
- African clawed frog
- Boettger's dainty frog
- Common sand frog
- Common caco
- Karoo toad
- Tandy's sand frog
- Poynton's river frog (Amietia poyntoni)

=== Birds ===
There are estimated between 215 and 264 bird species, with 25 near endemic and two endemic species, the red lark and Sclater's lark.

- Black harrier
- Chestnut-banded plover
- Cinnamon-breasted warbler
- Karoo korhaan
- Kori bustard
- Lanner falcon
- Ludwig’s bustard
- Martial eagle
- Secretarybird
- Verreaux’s eagle

=== Invertebrates ===
Termites are thought to be found within the park with the existence of heuweltjies.

- Honey bee
- Harvester ant

=== Mammals ===
There have been 29 species of mammal documented in the park, including three bat species:

- Aardvark
- Aardwolf
- Black-backed jackal
- Caracal
- Crested porcupine
- Natal long-fingered bat
- Rock hyrax
- Springbok
- Steenbok

=== Reptiles ===
- Bibron's thick-toed gecko
- Boulenger's cape tortoise
- Bug-eyed house snake (Boaedon mentalis)
- Cape cobra
- Cape house snake
- Common sand lizard
- Delalande's beaked blind snake
- Dwarf beaked snake
- Ground agama
- Horned adder
- Karoo girdled lizard
- Karoo sand snake
- Karoo tent tortoise
- Leopard tortoise
- Namaqua sand lizard
- Puff adder
- Purcell's gecko
- Quartz gecko
- Rough thick-toed gecko
- South African ground gecko
- Spotted sand lizard
- Variegated skink
- Western rock skink
- Western three-striped skink

== Gallery ==
Installation of the precursor satellite array

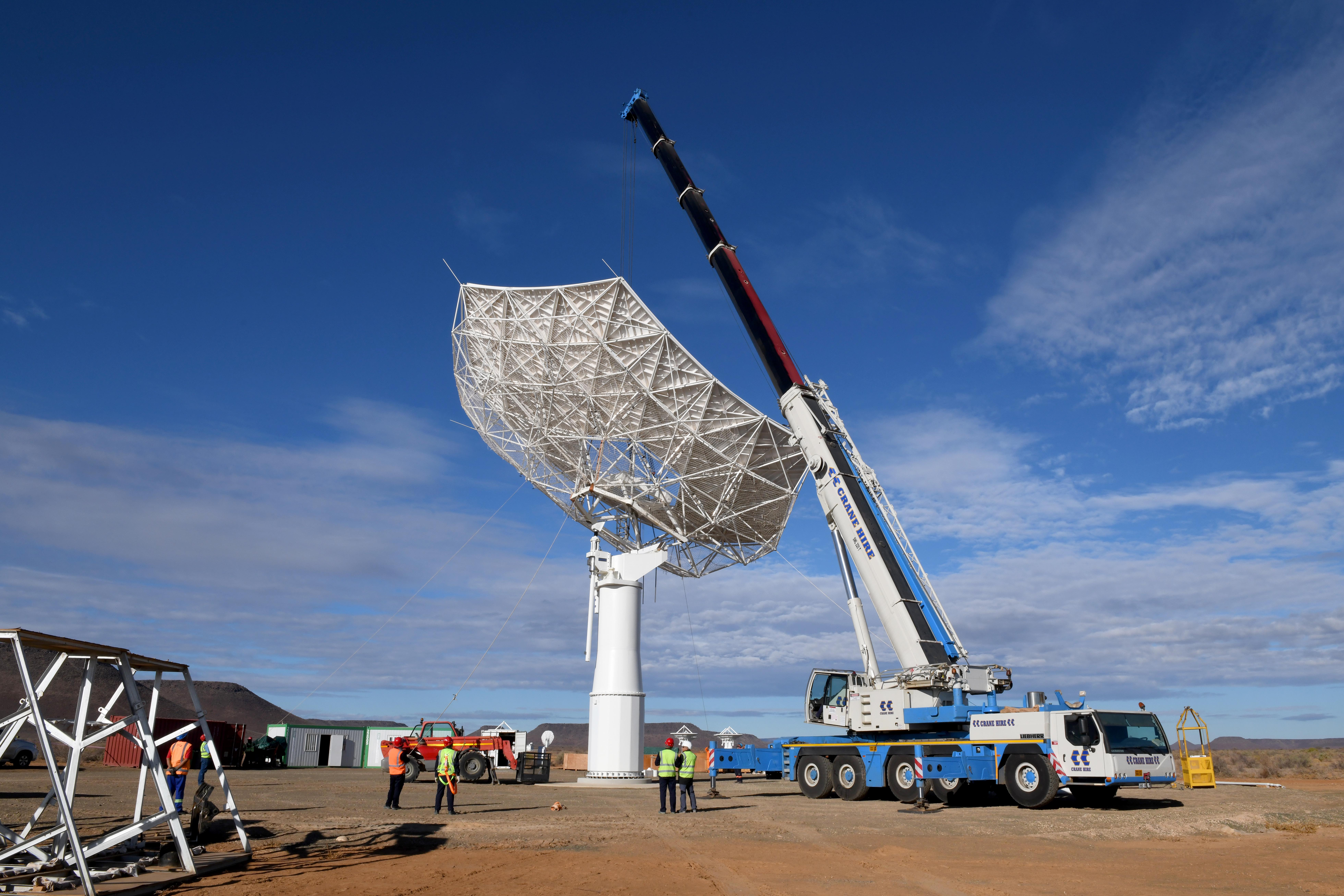

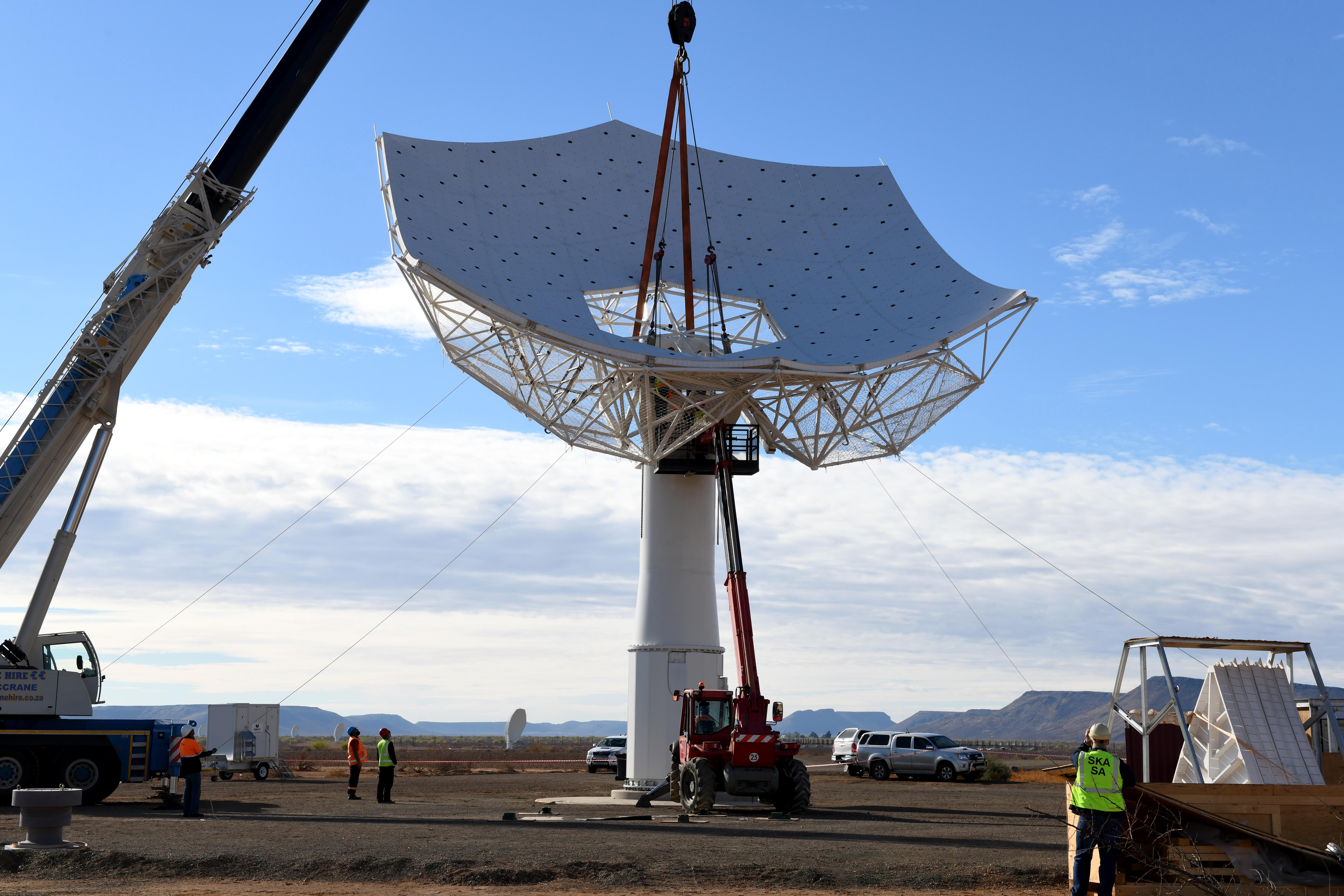

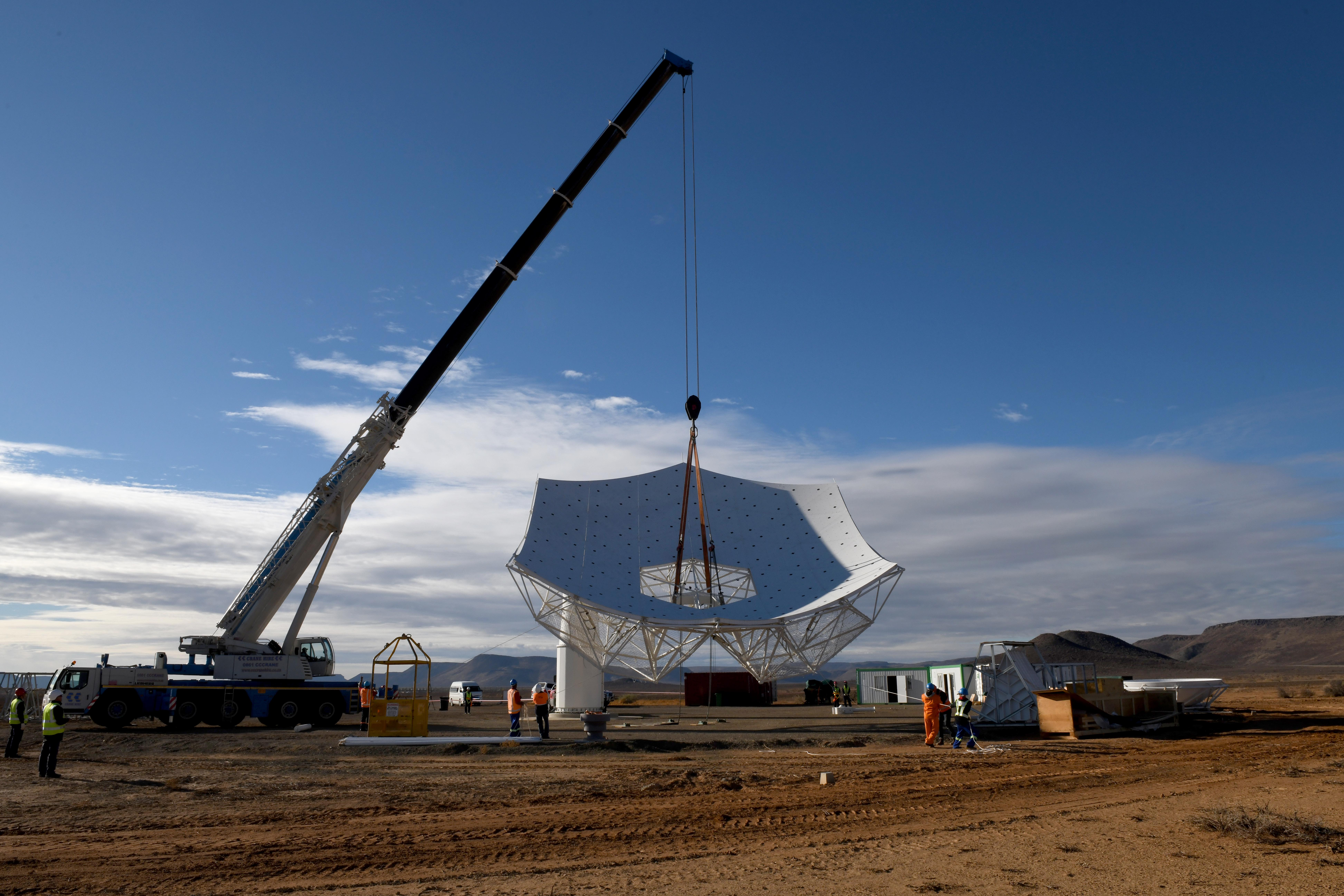

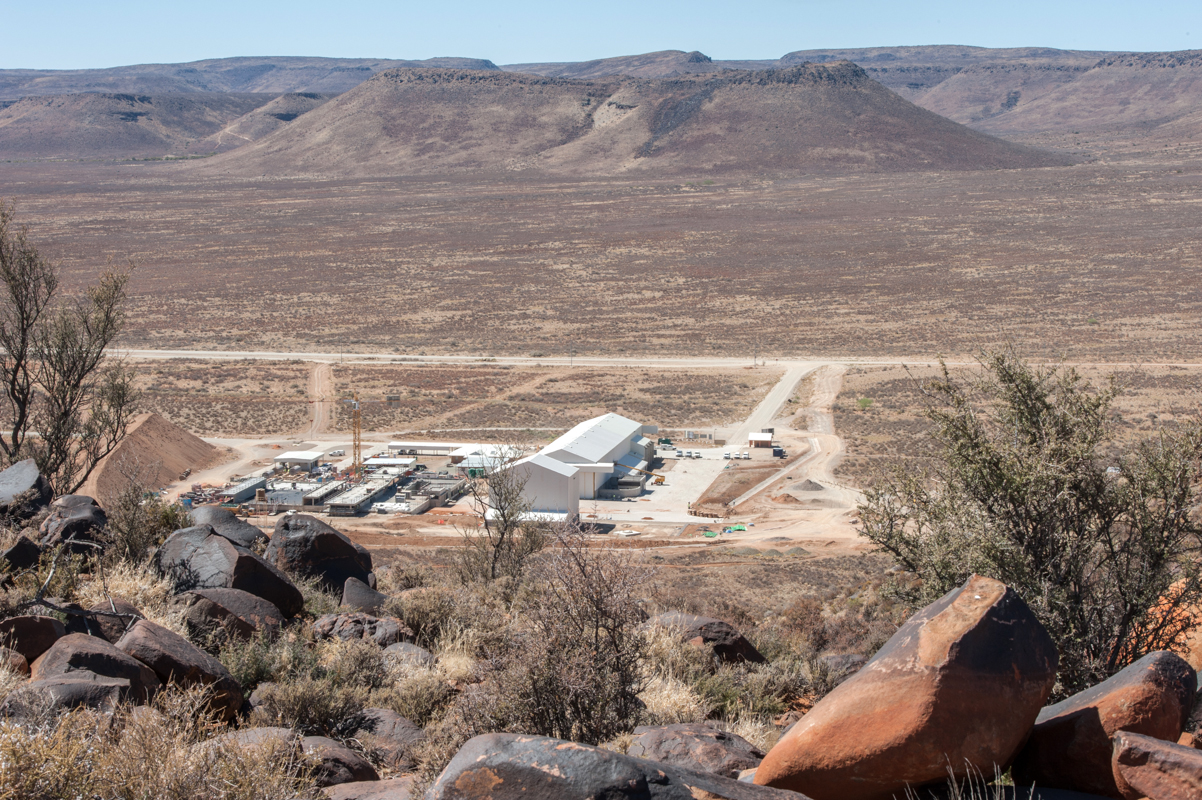

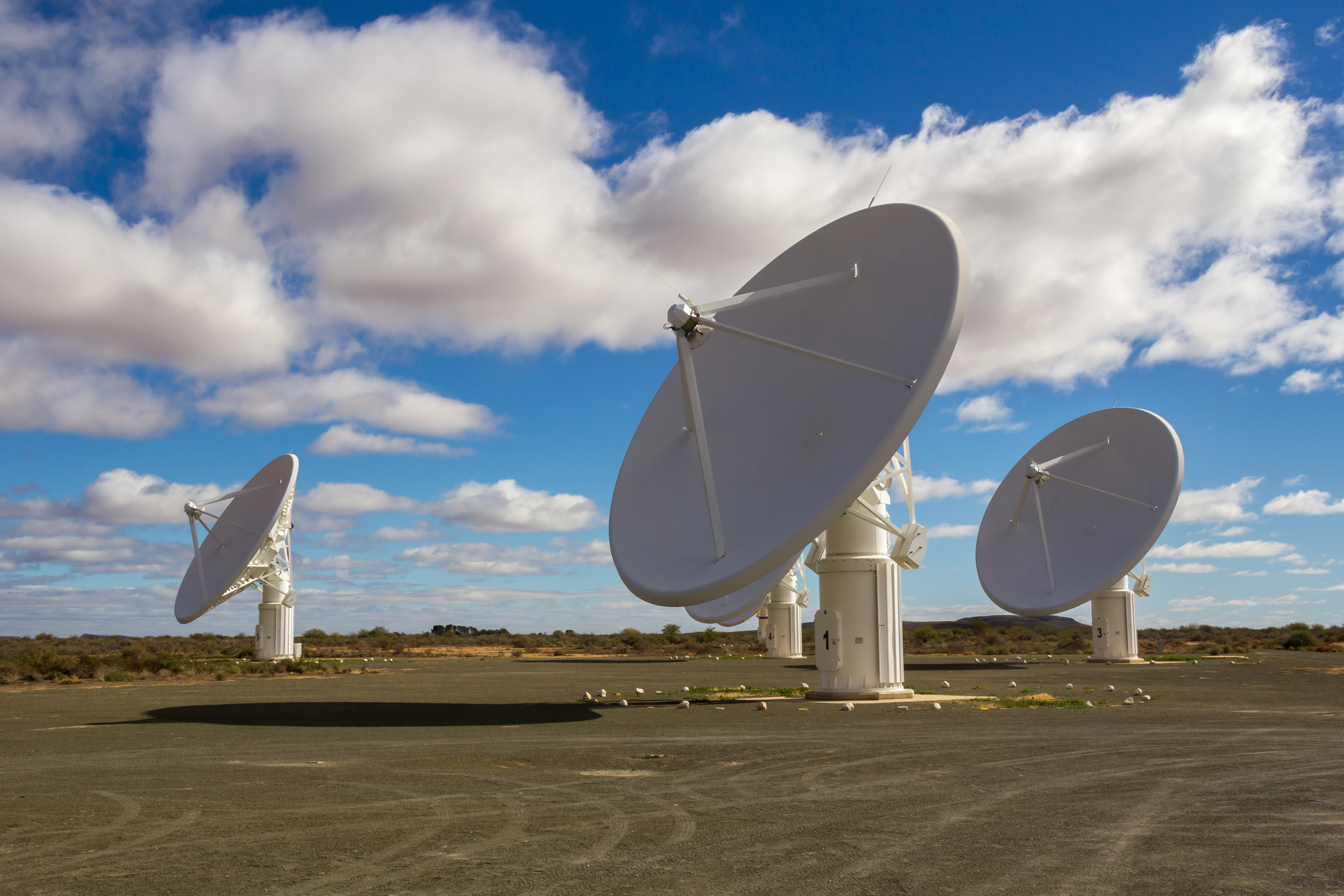
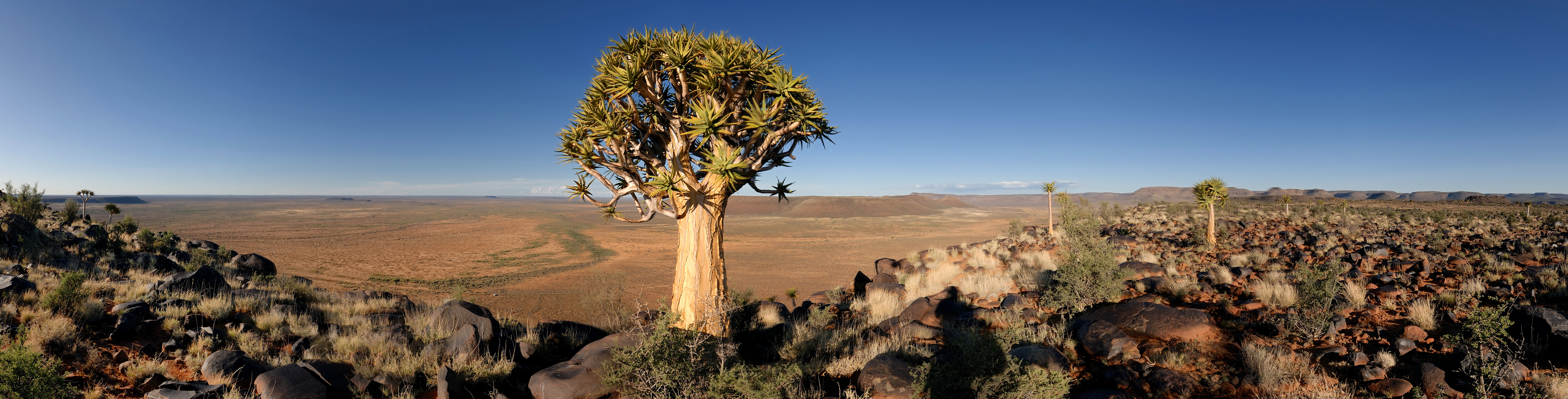
Quiver tree overlooking the park.
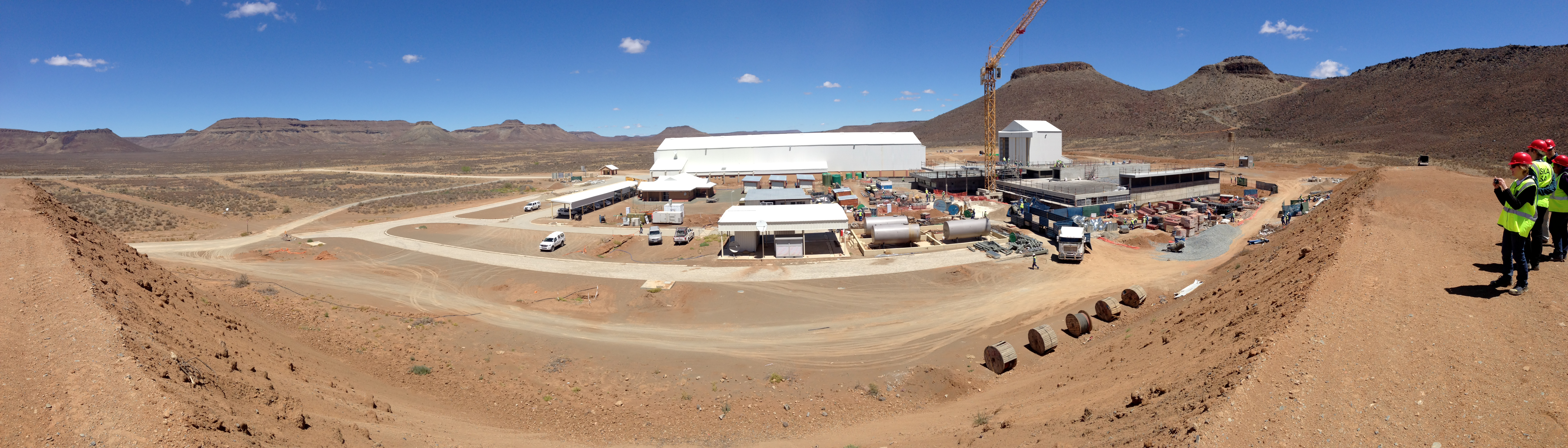
MeerKAT radio facility

== See also ==
- Protected areas of South Africa
