= Precision Array for Probing the Epoch of Reionization =

Radio interferometer

- Alternative names: PAPER
- Location(s): Meerkat National Park, Karoo Hoogland Local Municipality, Namakwa District Municipality, Northern Cape, RSA
- Coordinates: 30°43′21″S 21°25′40″E
- Wavelength: 1.5 m (200 MHz)–3.0 m (100 MHz)
- Number of telescopes: 64
- Collecting area: 18,000 m^{2} (190,000 sq ft)
- Website: eor.berkeley.edu
- Location of Precision Array for Probing the Epoch of Reionization

The Donald C. Backer Precision Array for Probing the Epoch of Reionization (PAPER) is a radio interferometer funded by the National Science Foundation to detect 21 cm hydrogen (HI) fluctuations occurring when the first galaxies ionized intergalactic gas at around 500 million years after the Big Bang. PAPER is a focused experiment aimed toward making the first statistical detection of the 21 cm reionization signal. Given the stringent dynamic range requirements for detecting reionization in the face of foregrounds that are five orders of magnitude brighter, the PAPER project is taking a carefully staged engineering approach, optimizing each component in the array to mitigate, at the outset, any potentially debilitating problems in subsequent data calibration and analysis. This staged approach addresses the observational challenges that arise from very-wide-field, high-dynamic-range imaging over wide bandwidths in the presence of transient terrestrial interference. PAPER began as a collaboration between Don Backer of the UC Berkeley Radio Astronomy Laboratory and Richard Bradley of the National Radio Astronomy Observatory. With Backer's passing in 2010, Aaron Parsons has assumed leadership of PAPER on the side of UC Berkeley.

The two fundamental concerns that most influence the design of any HI reionization detection instrument are removing foregrounds and achieving the requisite sensitivity. The PAPER approach heavily emphasizes the former; the level of instrumental calibration and foreground characterization that will be required to model and remove polarized galactic synchrotron emission, continuum point-sources, and galactic/extra-galactic free-free emission is unprecedented in the 100–200 MHz band expected to encompass reionization.

PAPER consists of two distinct arrays: one located at the NRAO site in Green Bank, WV, which is used primarily for engineering investigations and field testing, and another located at the South African SKA site in the Meerkat National Park located in the Karoo desert of the Northern Cape, South Africa, which is used for science observations.

== In Green Bank, West Virginia, US ==
PAPER in Green Bank has evolved over a few years from exploring basic systematics in a rudimentary four-element array to the more comprehensive system performance testing with the thirty-two element array that is currently deployed there. PAPER activities at the NRAO site near Green Bank, WV began in 2005 with the deployment of a 4-antenna, single-polarization interferometer. After substantial testing and improvement of the PAPER design, we deployed eight antennas in a nearby field in April, 2008. This new system incorporated antenna elements with ground-screen flaps and a digital correlator based on CASPER hardware.

== In South Africa ==
The South African array is aimed toward realizing our primary science objective: detecting reionization. The instrument is located at the P2 site on the Square Kilometre Array South Africa (SKA-SA) in the Meerkat National Park near the small town of Carnarvon. Deployments at the SKA-South Africa site in the Karoo desert began with ground breaking and the deployment of 16 antennas in October 2009, continued with an increase to 32 antennas in April 2010, followed by commissioning and observing in May 2010. The array was expanded again in July 2011 to 64 elements. An expansion to 128 antennas is planned for 2013.

== In the HERA roadmap ==
PAPER, along with the Murchison Widefield Array, are frontier projects within the Hydrogen Epoch of Reionization Array (HERA) program. The HERA road map for exploring reionization was organized into three sequential phases. Phase I has as its goal the first statistical detection of the HI 21 cm signal from reionization. HERA II entails applying lessons learned during Phase I to define and build a larger array capable of detailed characterization of the statistical signal and imaging the brightest reionization structures. The final stage of HERA, Phase III, will address the challenges of full tomographic imaging using an SKA-scale facility with capabilities informed by the earlier work. The HERA program was the highest ranked of the Decadal Survey RMS Panel scientific recommendations.

== Project partners ==
- University of California, Berkeley
- The National Radio Astronomy Observatory
- University of Pennsylvania
- The Square Kilometre Array (SKA South Africa)
