= Publications of the Astronomical Society of Australia =

- Discipline: Astronomy, astrophysics
- Language: English
- Edited by: Dr. Minh Huynh

Publication details
- History: 1967–present
- Publisher: Cambridge University Press on behalf of the Astronomical Society of Australia
- Frequency: Continuous
- Impact factor: 6.51 (2021)

Standard abbreviations
- ISO 4: Publ. Astron. Soc. Aust.

Indexing
- CODEN: PASAFO
- ISSN: 1323-3580 (print); 1448-6083 (web)
- LCCN: 96658080
- OCLC no.: 958649852

Links
- Journal homepage; Online archive

Publications of the Astronomical Society of Australia is a peer-reviewed scientific journal covering all aspects of astrophysics and astronomy. The Editor-in-Chief is Dr. Minh Huynh (CSIRO).

The journal was established at the inaugural meeting of the newly-formed Astronomical Society of Australia on 30 November 1966 as the Proceedings of the Astronomical Society of Australia with the first volume going into print in March 1967. It was run by a single Editor, Dick McGee, until 1989 when an editorial board was established. Up to 1994 its primary purpose was to publish papers presented at the Annual General Meeting of the ASA, although historical papers and book reviews were also considered for publication.

Starting with Volume 12 published in 1994 the name was changed to the current Publications of the Astronomical Society of Australia, reflecting a wider remit towards publishing general astronomy research papers. PASA was first published electronically in 1996 under a partnership with CSIRO publishing. Since 2013 it has been published by Cambridge University Press on behalf of the Astronomical Society of Australia.

== Editors ==
Editors of PASA have included:

- Paul Wild (1967–1969)
- Richard "Dick" McGee (1971–1988)
- Richard Hunstead (1989–1991)
- Ravi Sood (1992–1993)
- Jenny Nicholls (1994–1995)
- Michelle Storey (1996–2000)
- Russell Cannon (2001)
- John Lattanzio (2002–2008)
- Bryan Gaensler (2009–2014)
- Daniel Price (2015–2017)
- Melanie Johnston-Hollitt (2018–2019)
- Stas Shabala (2019–2022)
- Ivo Seitenzahl (2022–2024)
- Minh Huynh (2025-)

== Abstracting and indexing ==
The journal is abstracted and indexed in:

- Astrophysics Data System
- Chemical Abstracts Service
- Current Contents/Physical, Chemical & Earth Sciences
- Physics Abstracts
- Science Citation Index
- Scopus

According to the Journal Citation Reports, the journal has a 2020 impact factor of 5.571.
