= Amanda Bauer =

American astronomer and science communicator (born 1979)

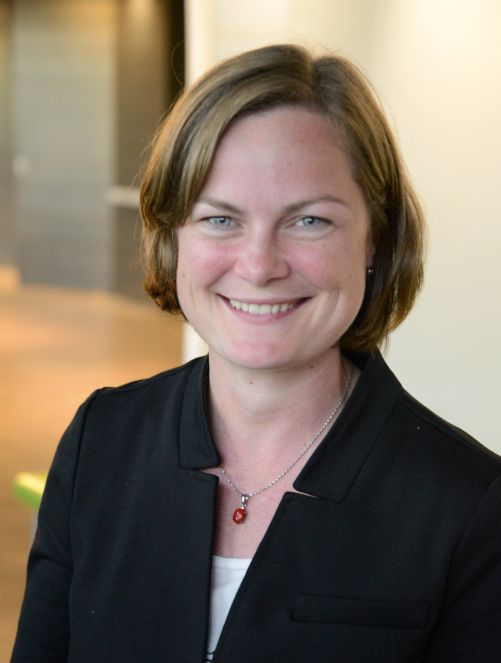
- Born: May 26, 1979 (age 47); Cincinnati, Ohio, U.S.
- Education: University of Cincinnati; University of Texas at Austin
- Known for: Head of Education and Public Outreach
- Awards: ARC Super Science Fellowship
- Scientific career
- Fields: Astronomy
- Workplaces: Australian Astronomical Observatory; Large Synoptic Survey Telescope

Amanda Elaine Bauer (born 26 May 1979) is an American professional astronomer and science communicator. She is the deputy director and Head of Science and Education at Yerkes Observatory in Williams Bay, Wisconsin. She was previously based in Tucson, Arizona working as the deputy director of Vera C. Rubin Observatory Operations, which began observing in 2025 to capture the Legacy Survey of Space ad Time (LSST). Prior to that, she was the Head of Education and Public Outreach for Rubin Observatory.

== Early life and education ==
Bauer grew up in Cincinnati, Ohio, United States. She had an interest in astronomy since she was young, and enjoyed the math club in high school, but at the time she did not consider that these could be a career. In college, at the University of Cincinnati, she initially majored in French, but she changed to Science after trying unsuccessfully to arrange to study abroad. Her college did not have an Astronomy department, so instead she majored in physics. While pursuing her undergraduate degree, she undertook a student internship with the Sloan Digital Sky Survey from 2000 to 2002. She graduated with a Bachelor of Science with High Honors in Physics from the University of Cincinnati in 2002.

Bauer immediately started her master's degree in astronomy at the University of Texas at Austin. This was where she started her involvement with the area that would become the major focus of her research career: galaxy assembly and evolution. She graduated as a Master of Science in 2004 and began studying for a PhD in Astrophysics, still at the University of Texas at Austin. This included working as a research associate at the Max Planck Institute for Extraterrestrial Physics in Germany in 2006, and at the Gemini Observatory in Chile in 2007. She was awarded her PhD in 2008, with her thesis entitled Star-Forming Galaxies Growing Up Over the Last Ten Billion Years.

== Research career ==
After completing her PhD, Bauer accepted a postdoctoral fellowship at the University of Nottingham in England (September 2008 - November 2010). When that finished, she moved to Australia to take up a three-year ARC "Super Science Fellowship", working at the Australian Astronomical Observatory (AAO).

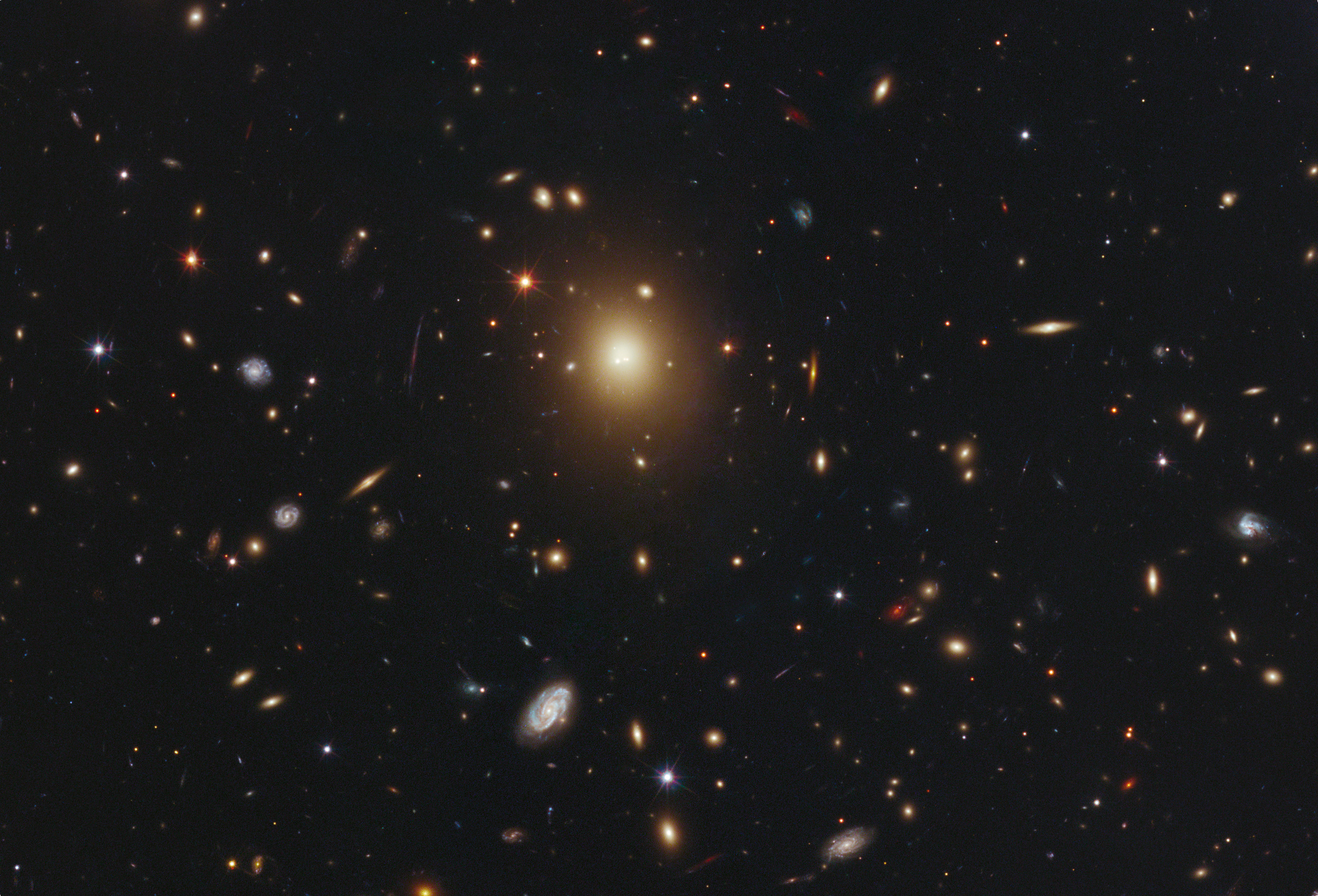
A galaxy's position within a cluster such as this (Abell 2261) affects how it can form new stars.

At the conclusion of that fellowship in November 2013, Bauer took up the role of Research Astronomer at the AAO. Her area of research investigates the processes by which galaxies form, and particularly why they eventually stop creating new stars. In order to explore how galaxies build into the diverse structures we see today, she analyzed systematic surveys of hundreds of thousands of galaxies, looking for clues that indicate what physical processes regulate the rates at which new stars are formed in galaxies which are subjected to different conditions.

In 2012, she published her findings from a study into the evolution of stars within galaxies which themselves are members of galaxy clusters, using the Gemini North Observatory in Hawaii. The research found that a galaxy's position within the galactic cluster affected stellar evolution within that galaxy: the closer a galaxy is to the center of a cluster, the sooner it stops forming new stars. The interpretation of this is that near the centre of the cluster, the large number of close galactic neighbours influence each other through gravitation to produce a sea of hot gas, and that hot gas seems to be the limiting factor that constrains new star formation. Mergers of galaxies also play a part: her forecasts of how our own Milky Way galaxy will merge with the Andromeda Galaxy and the two smaller Magellanic Cloud galaxies in several billion years have prompted further new studies into how that will affect the rates of star formation locally.

As of February 2015, Cornell University's arXiv service lists 61 publications of her astronomical research in peer-reviewed journals, mostly in the categories of either Astrophysics of Galaxies or Cosmology. She has presented her findings at international professional conferences and institutions, including the Annual Science Meeting of the Astronomical Society of Australia in July 2011, Adler Planetarium, Chicago, in September 2013 and the AusGO (Australian Gemini Office) Observational Techniques Workshop in April 2014.

== Public outreach ==
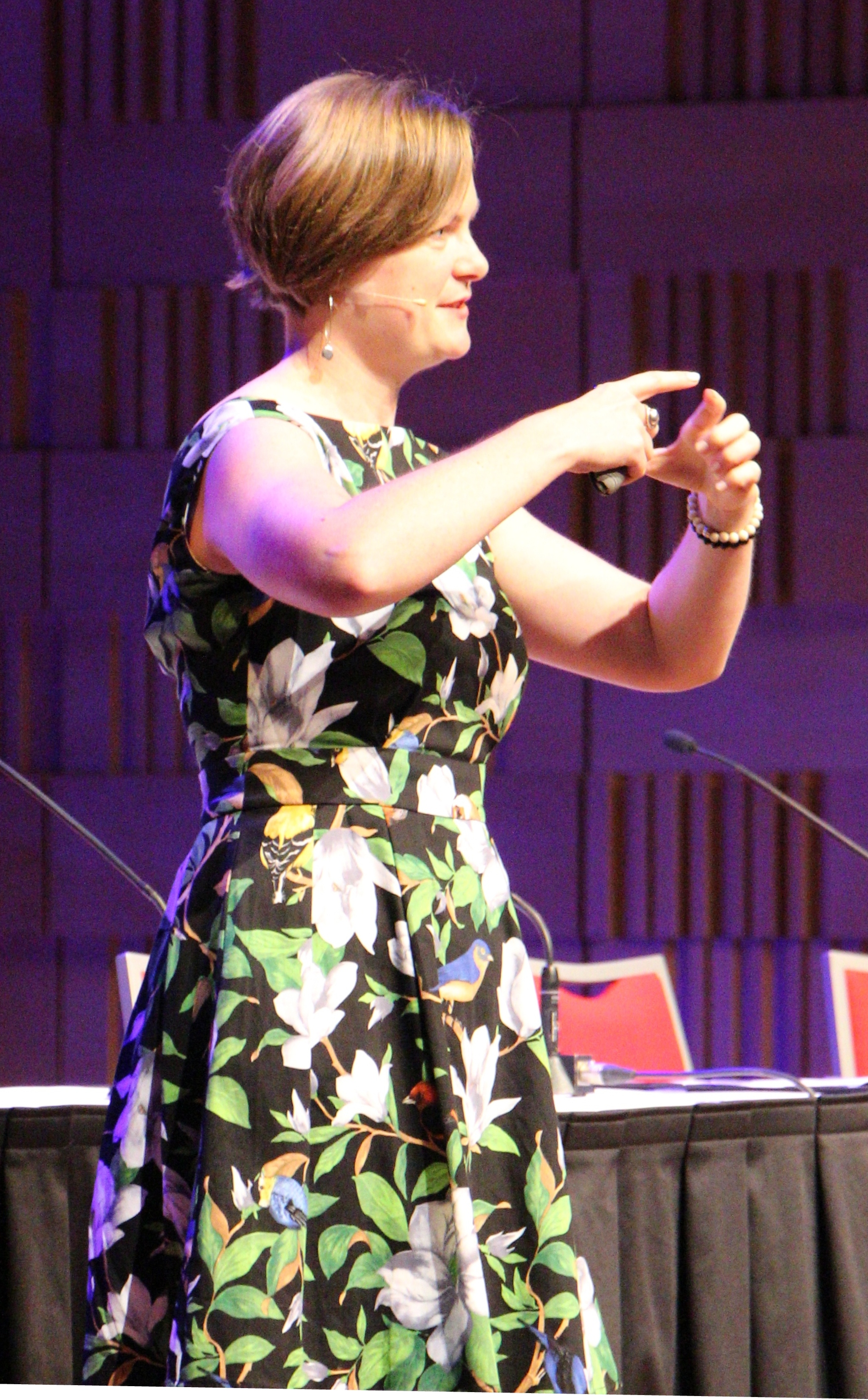
Amanda Bauer giving a public presentation in November 2014.

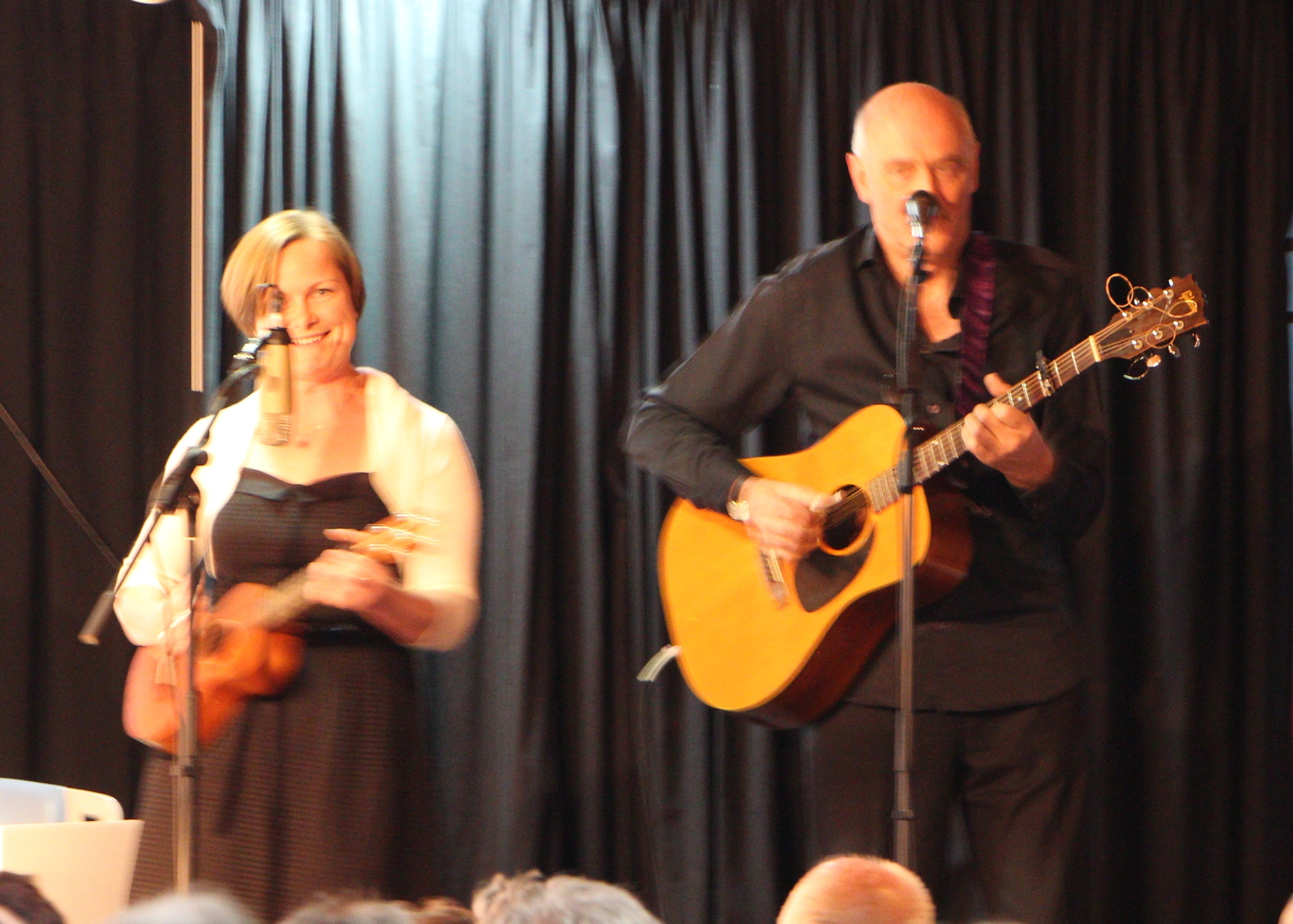
Amanda Bauer (on ukulele) and Fred Watson (on guitar) provide a musical interlude at the 2014 celebrations of the 40th anniversary of the Anglo-Australian Telescope.

Bauer started her involvement with organized public outreach in a project called Sixty Symbols of Physics and Astronomy during her postdoctoral fellowship at the University of Nottingham in England. She contributed regular interviews to this series from 2009 to 2011. After leaving Nottingham, she continued her outreach activities informally with her "Astropixie" blog.

In 2013, while she was working at the AAO, in addition to her research role, Bauer became the first official Outreach Officer for the AAO. The objective of this role is "to develop strategies to capture and communicate the excitement of new astronomical discoveries and innovative engineering feats occurring within the AAO and the astronomical community." She manages the AAO's online presence, especially social media using its Facebook, Twitter (@AAOastro) and YouTube channel, and the AAO's growing collection of online videos for the public. She also works with more conventional media by acting as the AAO's media contact and issuing press releases, edits the AAO Observer newsletter, gives public talks, writes science articles for several publications, visits schools, talks to members of parliament, and curated a public photographic exhibition. The importance of her outreach role became particularly apparent in January 2013 when bush-fires threatened the astronomical installations on top of Siding Spring mountain: Bauer was the media contact ensuring that the latest information was available.

Since March 2012, Bauer has been a regular expert co-host on the Titanium Physicists Podcast. In March 2017, she started a new podcast, Cosmic Vertigo with co-host Dr Alan Duffy.

Bauer is a regular guest on ABC Radio and ABC News television, a guest writer for Australian Sky & Telescope magazine, guest writer and astronomy contact for Cosmos magazine, featured astrophysicist in video series Deep Sky Videos and Sixty Symbols of Physics and Astronomy. Her live presentations have been in front of the public, astronomical organizations and school groups, with audiences up to 350 people at the Australian Skeptics National Convention in November 2014. She teaches the "Scientists in Schools" program for 8- to 12-year-old students, and "CAASTRO in the Classroom" astronomy lessons to about 100 students. In her spare time, she also maintains her own "astropixie" blog and Twitter feed about astronomy.

She also takes an active role in helping other astronomers to develop their own skills in science communication, by conducting workshops and giving talks to professionals, including the ASA Harley Wood School in July 2014, the AAO Colloquium on Outreach in March 2014, and "dotAstronomy: Networked Astronomy and New Media" in Boston in September 2013. She is the Director of "dotAstronomy 7" which will be held in Sydney in November 2015.

In 2014, the Astronomical Society of Australia acknowledged her contributions to public outreach by electing her to the Steering Committee of its Education and Public Outreach Chapter (EPOC) for a two-year term.

In early 2017, Bauer moved back the US and joined the Large Synoptic Survey Telescope (LSST, later renamed as the Vera C. Rubin Observatory) as Head of Education and Public Outreach. In December 2019, she also took on the role of Interim Deputy Director for LSST Operations.

In May 2022, Yerkes Observatory announced that she had been appointed as the new deputy director and Head of Science and Education, starting in July. In this newly created role, she and leads the science, research, telescope operations, and education programs of the Observatory.

== Personal life ==
Bauer enjoys live acoustic music, camping, hiking, and swimming. She says that "the best of all worlds is when she goes camping at music festivals, enjoying the companionship, the great music, the campfires, and sleeping under the stars."

In February 2016, she gave birth to a daughter, Ida Luna.

== Selected publications ==
- Co-chaired the Australian Astronomy Decadal Plan Working Group 3.2 on Education, Outreach, and Careers.
- Bauer, A. E.; Hopkins, A. M.; et al. (2013). "Galaxy And Mass Assembly (GAMA): Linking Star Formation Histories and Stellar Mass Growth". Monthly Notices of the Royal Astronomical Society. 434 (1): 209. arXiv:1306.2424. Bibcode:2013MNRAS.434..209B. doi:10.1093/mnras/stt1011. S2CID 10680203.
- Bauer, A. E.; Grützbauch, R.; Jorgensen, I.; Varela, J.; Bergmann, M. (2011). "Star Formation in the XMMU J2235.3-2557 Galaxy Cluster at z = 1:39". Monthly Notices of the Royal Astronomical Society. 411 (3): 2009B. arXiv:1010.1238. Bibcode:2011MNRAS.411.2009B. doi:10.1111/j.1365-2966.2010.17828.x. S2CID 119268712.
- Bauer, A. E.; Conselice, C. J.; Pérez-González, P.G.; Grützbauch, R.; Bluck, A.F.L.; Buitrago, F.; Mortlock, A. (2011). "Star Formation in a Stellar Mass Selected Sample of Galaxies to z = 3 from the GOODS NICMOS Survey" (PDF). Monthly Notices of the Royal Astronomical Society. 417 (289): 289. arXiv:1106.2656. Bibcode:2011MNRAS.417..289B. doi:10.1111/j.1365-2966.2011.19240.x. S2CID 53357504.
- Bauer, A. E.; Drory, N.; Hill, G.J.; Feulner, G. (2005). "Specific Star Formation Rates to Redshift 1.5". The Astrophysical Journal. 621 (1): L89–92. arXiv:1106.2656. Bibcode:2011MNRAS.417..289B. doi:10.1111/j.1365-2966.2011.19240.x. S2CID 53357504.

== Awards and recognition ==
- 2016: Featured STEM Career Profile in the inaugural issue of Science News.
- 2015: Winner (one of five) in the Top 5 under 40 competition conducted by the UNSW and ABC Radio National "to discover Australia’s new generation of passionate science communicators"
- 2015: Australian Institute of Physics NSW Community Outreach to Physics Award
- 2014 - 2016: Steering Committee member of the Astronomical Society of Australia's Education and Public Outreach Chapter (EPOC)
- 2010-2013: ARC Super Science Fellowship at the AAO
- 2013: Nominated for Dept of Industry Excellence in Innovation Award
- Committee member of the Astronomical Society of Australia
- 2012: National finalist in the Fresh Science Media competition
- 2012: Represented the Astronomical Society of Australia at "Science Meets Parliament"
- 2009: Strategic Grant Award from the British Science Association
- 2006, 2007: NASA/Texas Space Grant Consortium Graduate Fellowship
