= Melanie Johnston-Hollitt =

Australian astrophysicist

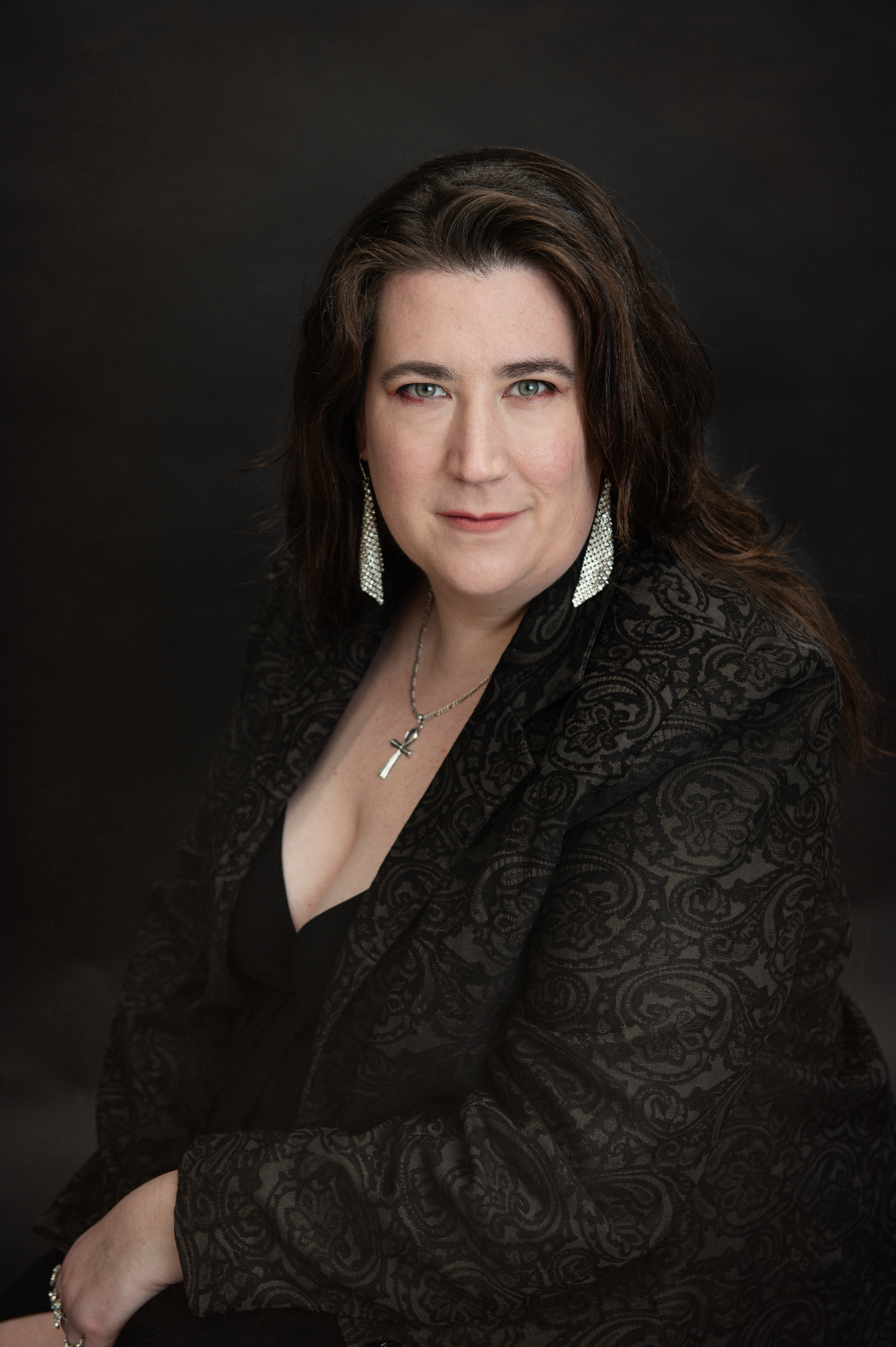
- Born: 8 September 1974 (age 52); Darwin, Australia
- Education: University of Adelaide
- Known for: Design and governance of international radio telescopes Radio observations of Galaxy Clusters
- Scientific career
- Fields: Astronomy; Astrophysics; Radio Astronomy
- Thesis: Detection of magnetic fields and diffuse radio emission in Abell 3667 and other rich southern clusters of galaxies (2003)
- Doctoral advisor: Ronald Ekers; Richard Hunstead

Melanie Johnston-Hollitt (née Johnston; 8 September 1974) is an Australian astrophysicist and professor. She has worked on the design, construction, and international governance of several radio telescopes including the Low Frequency Array (LOFAR), the Murchison Widefield Array (MWA) and the upcoming Square Kilometre Array (SKA). She was the director of the Murchison Widefield Array until December 2020 and is a professor at the Curtin Institute of Radio Astronomy at Curtin University and the International Centre for Radio Astronomy Research. Since August 2020, Johnston-Hollitt is the director of the Curtin Institute for Data Science.

== Early life ==
Johnston-Hollitt was born on 8 September 1974 in Darwin, Australia. She was born shortly before Cyclone Tracy destroyed the city after which she and her mother were evacuated to Brisbane on 29 December 1974 en route to Townsville. During her early life she lived in various parts of Queensland before her family returned to Darwin in 1979. In 1986 her family moved to Adelaide where she completed high school. Johnston-Hollitt attended the University of Adelaide, where she earned two degrees: one in theoretical and experimental physics and the other in mathematics and computer science.

She also completed a BSc with honors in astrophysics under the supervision of Roger Clay, and a doctorate in radio astronomy jointly with the University of Adelaide and the CSIRO Australia Telescope National Facility under the supervision of Ron Ekers and Richard Hunstead.

== Career ==
Johnston-Hollitt moved to Leiden Observatory at the University of Leiden in the Netherlands as the inaugural LOFAR Fellow, joining the group of George Miley to work on the design of the LOFAR telescope. In 2004, she took up a continuing faculty position at the University of Tasmania. In January 2009 she moved to Victoria University of Wellington in New Zealand to establish and lead a new radio astronomy group.

Johnston-Hollitt worked on NZ's engagement with the Square Kilometre Array, and she served in an advisory role for the New Zealand Government on the project from April 2009 to January 2018. Shortly after commencing her term advising the NZ Government, it was announced that NZ would join Australia in bidding to host the SKA telescope. Johnston-Hollitt was subsequently an author of the Australia-New Zealand bid to host the SKA, responsible for identifying possible SKA station sites in New Zealand. From 2011, she was a government-appointed member of the preparatory group set-up to establish the SKA, and then director for the SKA from December 2011 to January 2018.

For her scientific leadership she was appointed by the SKAO as founding co-chair of the SKA Cosmic Magnetism Science Working group in March 2013, and along with her co-chair, Federica Govoni, defined the early SKA requirements associated with cosmic magnetism, editing the magnetism sections of the SKA Science Case and writing the cosmic magnetism scientific summary paper.

Johnston-Hollitt led the 2011 bid for NZ to join the Murchison Widefield Array, a low frequency precursor to the SKA. She joined the MWA Board in 2012, became vice-chair in 2013, and held the position of chair from January 2014 to January 2018. In early 2017 she became founder and chief executive officer (CEO) of Peripety Scientific, an independent research organisation specialising in radio astronomy research and consultancy based in Wellington. She resigned from Victoria University of Wellington in September 2017 and became a professor of Radio Astronomy at Curtin University and director of the Murchison Widefield Array. During her time as chair of the MWA board, Professor Johnston-Hollitt was responsible for the expansion of the MWA project to move from 11 research organisations over 3 countries with 112 individual researchers to 21 research organisations over 6 countries with 270 individual researchers. As MWA Director, she oversaw the third phase of the MWA project realised via the design and funding for the new 'MWAX correlator' - a GPU-based bespoke compute system.

After finishing her 3 year term as MWA director in December 2020, Johnston-Hollitt continues to be the lead of the galactic and extragalactic science team in the Curtin Institute for Radio Astronomy, who are exploiting the MWA and other telescopes to uncover the mysteries of the Universe. Further, Professor Johnston-Hollitt has been appointed as the new Director of the Curtin Institute for Data Science (CIDS) in August 2020, leading a multi-disciplinary team of data scientists. The CIDS is a cross-disciplinary research accelerator based on the use of high-performance computing.

== Research career ==
Johnston-Hollitt's primary research interests are cosmic magnetism and observations of galaxy clusters, primarily through the use of radio telescopes. She has authored over 230 publications. She has served on the Editorial Board of Publications of the Astronomical Society of Australia since January 2015, commencing a 3-year term as Editor-in-Chief from January 2018.

Johnston-Hollitt has gained funding for design, construction and exploitation of radio telescopes across Europe, Australia and New Zealand. She has held several visiting positions as a guest professor at the Excellence Cluster Universe in Munich, Germany, the Sophia Antipolis University in Nice, France, the University of Bologna, Italy, and the University of Malaya.

== Awards ==
- 2002: Union of Radio Scientists International (URSI) Young Scientist Award
- 2006: Faculty Early Career Research Award – University of Tasmania
- 2010: Hudson Lecturer – Royal Society of New Zealand

== See also ==
- List of female scientists in the 21st century
- List of University of Adelaide people
