= Alan Duffy (astronomer) =

Astronomer and science communicator (born 1983)

Alan R. Duffy
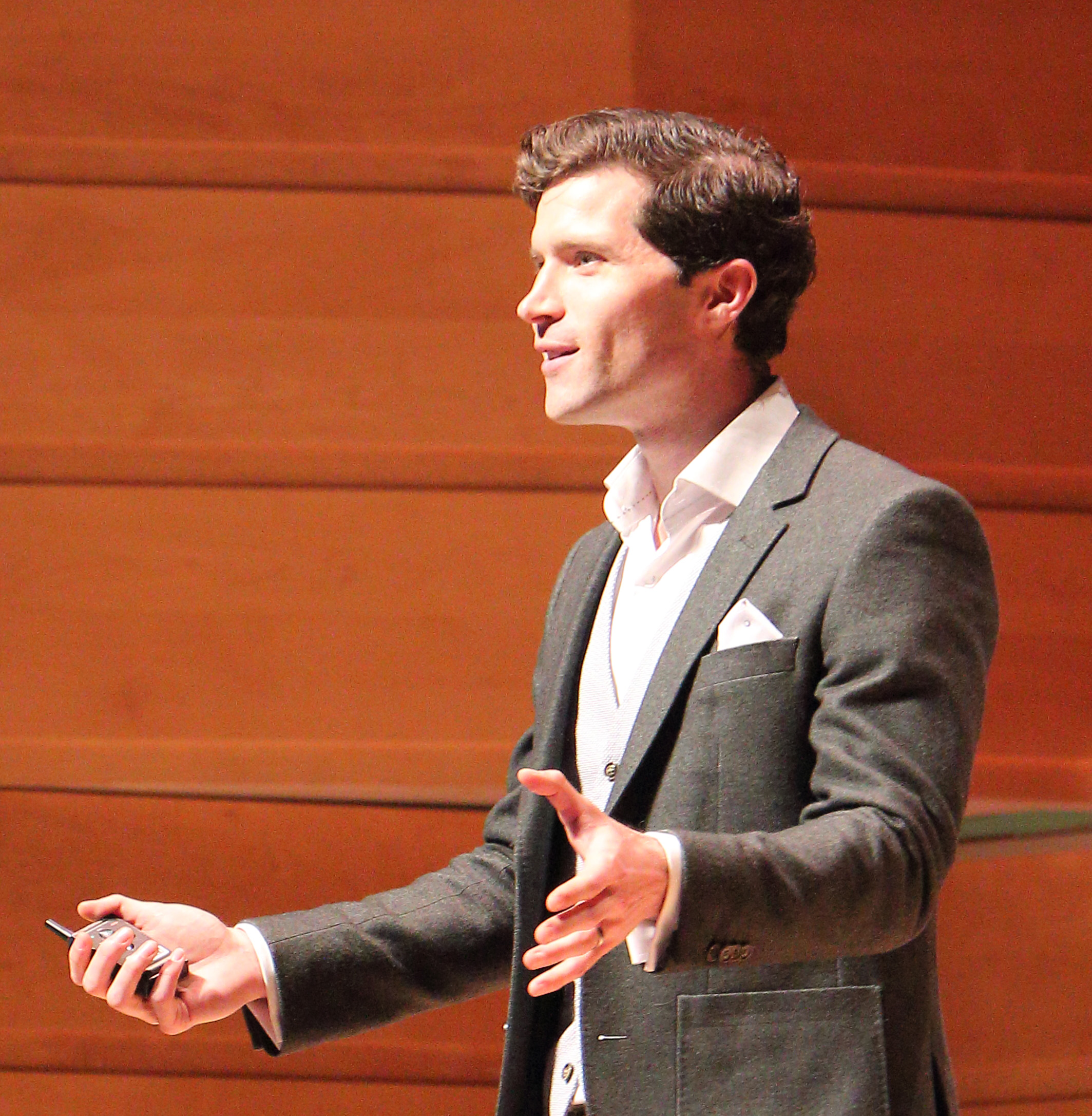
- Duffy speaking at the Skepticon conference in Sydney, Australia on 18 November 2017
- Born: 1983 (age 42–43); Peterborough, England, UK
- Education: University of Manchester
- Spouse: Sarah Clarke (m. 2016)
- Scientific career
- Fields: Astronomy
- Workplaces: Swinburne University; University of Melbourne; ICRAR; University of Western Australia

Alan R. Duffy (born 1983) is a British and Australian professional astronomer and science communicator. He was born in England, raised in Northern Ireland, and is currently based in Australia. He is a professor at the Centre for Astrophysics and Supercomputing at Swinburne University of Technology, and is the Lead Scientist at the Royal Institution of Australia.

His research is focused on using super-computers to build and test models of the growth of galaxies within vast dark matter halos, and in particular focuses on the formation of the first galaxies in the early universe during the "Epoch of Reionisation". These models aim to improve our understanding of the nature of dark matter, and the large scale properties of the universe.

== Early life and studies ==
Duffy was born in Peterborough, England. His family migrated to Northern Ireland when he was four years old, where he attended Ballyclare High School.

His undergraduate studies in physics were conducted at the University of Manchester. He incorporated periods of study in the Netherlands on an EU scholarship, working on supercomputers at Europe's oldest observatory in Leiden University, and undertook physics at the University of Amsterdam, even though he spoke no Dutch when he started. He graduated with a MPhys (1st) in 2005. He completed his PhD in Astronomy and Astrophysics at Jodrell Bank Observatory based in the University of Manchester in 2009, with his thesis entitled "Investigation of large scale structure in the Universe".

== Academic career ==
As Duffy was completing his doctorate, work was starting on the Australian component of the world's largest astronomical facility, the Square Kilometre Array. His doctoral work had covered similar topics, and he was invited to join the first stage of this telescope; the Australian Square Kilometre Array Pathfinder (ASKAP). He moved to Perth, Western Australia in 2009 to take up the position at the International Centre for Radio Astronomy Research. Three years later, he moved to Melbourne to accept an academic post as Postdoctoral Research Fellow at the University of Melbourne, where he investigated the formation of the first galaxies in the early universe. Then in 2014 he took up the position of associate professor at Swinburne University of Technology, still based in Melbourne.

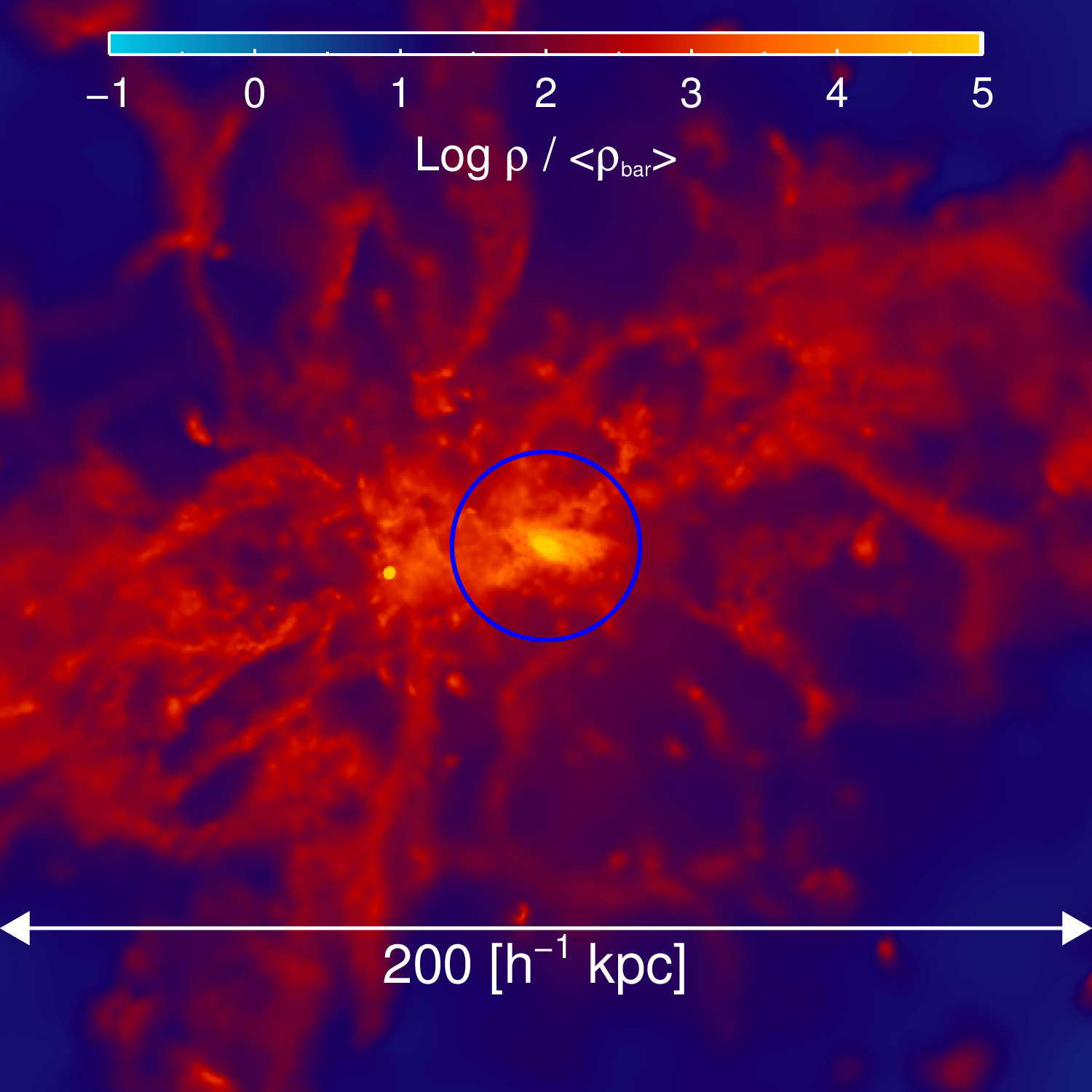
Duffy's simulation of the density of gas in and around a galaxy just over a billion years after the Big Bang. New gas is arriving at too great a rate for the galaxy to convert it into stars and the gas piles up.

His supercomputer simulations have shown that in very early galaxies, the rate of star formation was not enough to consume the infalling cold gas. Earlier models had assumed this was essentially molecular hydrogen, but the model from Duffy and the DRAGONS ("Dark-ages, Reionization And Galaxy-formation Observables Numerical Simulation") consortium also accounted for atomic (non-molecular) hydrogen. As a result, there was a deficit in the amount of gas that could form stars compared to the amount flowing in. By modelling the galaxies like an economy, Duffy was able to show that the early galaxies were in a "Great Galactic Recession". Those simulations focusing on the dark matter around galaxies demonstrate that without the dark matter, there would not have been enough time since the start of the universe for our galaxy to form.

He has attempted to directly detect this dark matter as part of SABRE ("Sodium-iodide with Active Background REjection"), an international research consortium with teams in Italy, US and Australia. SABRE is constructing the southern hemisphere's first dark matter detector 1 kilometre (0.62 mi) underground in a gold mine in Stawell, Victoria. He is also part of two Australian Research Council Centres of Excellence, investigating the origin of matter (ASTRO-3D) and seeing the Universe with gravitational waves (OzGrav), and he was a member of the worldwide OWLS (OverWhelmingly Large Simulations) collaboration.

== Science communications ==
In October 2017, the Royal Institution of Australia announced that it appointed Duffy as its Lead Scientist.

Duffy appears regularly on ABC's Breakfast News TV, ABC Radio Sydney, ABC Radio Melbourne, Ten's The Project, Nine's Today Weekends and TripleJ's Hack show, where he explains developments in science and space. He writes a regular column in The Conversation and the science magazine Cosmos.

He has presented at TEDx in the Sydney Opera House. He was the Ambassador for the Sydney Science Festival 2016, and host for Famelab showcasing Australian research and achievement in science, technology, engineering and mathematics. He hosted an Evening with Neil DeGrasse Tyson at the Melbourne Convention Centre, interviewed onstage Lawrence Krauss as well as Brian Greene, and presented in a national tour for BBC Worldwide's The Science of Doctor Who. He was a featured speaker at the Australian Skeptics' national conventions in 2017 and 2018. In 2018 he was a host of ABC's Stargazing Live series.

He wrote and starred in a 2012 science documentary about dark matter, Dark. Since December 2012 he has co-hosted the YouTube series Pint in the Sky with Katie Mack, and in March 2017 he started a new podcast, Cosmic Vertigo with co-host Amanda Bauer. As part of Science Week 2017, Duffy and Katie Mack launched a virtual reality tour of the Universe, using custom-made headsets and a free app.

Duffy's good looks have helped to attract media attention – MamaMia commented that "Unfortunately, I couldn't hear what he was saying over the sound of his cheekbones."

== Personal life ==
In January 2016, Duffy married Sarah Clarke. He qualified as an Australian citizen in October 2014.

Duffy has a keen interest in science fiction, telling the Belfast Telegraph:

Sci-fi was a big inspiration. My mum had remarried and my stepdad at the time was a ferocious nerd like me. We watched everything – Star Trek, Star Wars, all the classic sci-fi books by Asimov and Arthur C Clarke – and it opened up this world to me of all these possibilities... And, of course, Stephen Hawking's books – how could you not want to study physics? There are these incredible concepts – black holes, the universe expanding – that are so bizarre and yet are actually part of our world.

== Awards and recognition ==
- 2012 – He was named one of Western Australia Sunday Times magazine's "Best and Brightest".
- 2013 – Victorian State Finalist in the Fresh Science Award for science communication.
- 2013 – Commendation in the Astronomical Society of Australia's Louise Webster Prize for "outstanding research by a scientist early in their post-doctoral career".
- 2015 – He was named as one of Men's Style magazine's Men of Influence in 2015, "recognising the achievements of a diverse range of Australian men under 45 years of age".
- 2015 – Commonwealth Bank's Australian of the Day.
- 2016 – Finalist for Club Melbourne Fellowship
- 2016 – Finalist for the Australian Museum's Eureka Prize for promoting understanding of Australian science research.
- 2016 – Australia's Chief Scientist Alan Finkel named Duffy an "Australian Science Superhero".
- 2018 – Winner of the Australian Museum's Celestino Eureka Prize for Promoting Understanding of Science (one of the Eureka Prizes).
- 2026 – Elected Fellow of the Royal Society of Victoria

== Publications ==
As of August 2017, NASA's Astrophysics Data System (ADS) lists 29 publications by Duffy, which have 1,487 citations while Cornell University's arXiv lists 31 of his papers, covering a range of topics in general astronomy and cosmology.

- Duffy, Alan R.; Battye, Richard A.; Davies, Rod D.; Moss, Adam; Wilkinson, Peter N. (1 January 2008). "Galaxy redshift surveys selected by neutral hydrogen using the Five-hundred metre Aperture Spherical Telescope". Monthly Notices of the Royal Astronomical Society. 383 (1): 150–160. arXiv:0707.2316. Bibcode:2008MNRAS.383..150D. doi:10.1111/j.1365-2966.2007.12537.x. ISSN 0035-8711. S2CID 115546999.
- Duffy, Alan R.; Schaye, Joop; Kay, Scott T.; Dalla Vecchia., Claudio (March 2008). "Structure of Dark Matter Halos in Cosmological Simulations" (PDF). Proceedings of Cosmology 2008 – 43rd Rencontres de Moriond. Bibcode:2008PhDT........34B.
- Duffy, Alan R.; Schaye, Joop; Kay, Scott T.; Vecchia, Claudio Dalla (1 October 2008). "Dark matter halo concentrations in theWilkinson Microwave Anisotropy Probeyear 5 cosmology". Monthly Notices of the Royal Astronomical Society: Letters. 390 (1): L64–L68. arXiv:0804.2486. Bibcode:2008MNRAS.390L..64D. doi:10.1111/j.1745-3933.2008.00537.x. ISSN 1745-3925. S2CID 14022595.
  - Duffy, Alan R.; Schaye, Joop; Kay, Scott T.; Vecchia, Claudio Dalla (1 July 2011). "Erratum: Dark matter halo concentrations in the Wilkinson Microwave Anisotropy Probe year 5 cosmology". Monthly Notices of the Royal Astronomical Society: Letters. 415 (1): L85. arXiv:0804.2486. Bibcode:2011MNRAS.415L..85D. doi:10.1111/j.1745-3933.2011.01080.x. ISSN 1745-3925.
- Schaye, Joop; Vecchia, Claudio Dalla; Booth, C. M.; Wiersma, Robert P. C.; Theuns, Tom; Haas, Marcel R.; Bertone, Serena; Duffy, Alan R.; McCarthy, I. G.; Voort, Freeke van de (1 March 2010). "The physics driving the cosmic star formation history". Monthly Notices of the Royal Astronomical Society. 402 (3): 1536–1560. arXiv:0909.5196. Bibcode:2010MNRAS.402.1536S. doi:10.1111/j.1365-2966.2009.16029.x. ISSN 0035-8711. S2CID 118385462.
- Duffy, Alan R.; Schaye, Joop; Kay, Scott T.; Vecchia, Claudio Dalla; Battye, Richard A.; Booth, C. M. (11 July 2010). "Impact of baryon physics on dark matter structures: a detailed simulation study of halo density profiles". Monthly Notices of the Royal Astronomical Society. 405 (4): 2161. arXiv:1001.3447. Bibcode:2010MNRAS.405.2161D. doi:10.1111/j.1365-2966.2010.16613.x. ISSN 0035-8711. S2CID 118517066.
- Duffy, Alan R.; Kay, Scott T.; Battye, Richard A.; Booth, C. M.; Vecchia, Claudio Dalla; Schaye, Joop (11 March 2012). "Modelling neutral hydrogen in galaxies using cosmological hydrodynamical simulations". Monthly Notices of the Royal Astronomical Society. 420 (4): 2799–2818. arXiv:1107.3720. Bibcode:2012MNRAS.420.2799D. doi:10.1111/j.1365-2966.2011.19894.x. ISSN 0035-8711. S2CID 119264368.
- Duffy, Alan R.; Meyer, Martin J.; Staveley-Smith, Lister; Bernyk, Maksym; Croton, Darren J.; Koribalski, Bärbel S.; Gerstmann, Derek; Westerlund, Stefan (11 November 2012). "Predictions for ASKAP neutral hydrogen surveys". Monthly Notices of the Royal Astronomical Society. 426 (4): 3385–3402. arXiv:1208.5592. Bibcode:2012MNRAS.426.3385D. doi:10.1111/j.1365-2966.2012.21987.x. ISSN 0035-8711. S2CID 118625360.
- Duffy, A. R.; Moss, A.; Staveley-Smith, L. (2 January 2013). "Cosmological Surveys with the Australian Square Kilometre Array Pathfinder". Publications of the Astronomical Society of Australia. 29 (2): 202–211. arXiv:1103.3944. Bibcode:2012PASA...29..202D. doi:10.1071/AS11013. S2CID 119257539.
- Bryan, S. E.; Kay, S. T.; Duffy, A. R.; Schaye, J.; Vecchia, C. D.; Booth, C. M. (11 March 2013). "The impact of baryons on the spins and shapes of dark matter haloes". Monthly Notices of the Royal Astronomical Society. 429 (4): 3316–3329. arXiv:1207.4555. Bibcode:2013MNRAS.429.3316B. doi:10.1093/mnras/sts587. ISSN 0035-8711.
- Malarecki, J. M.; Staveley-Smith, L.; Saripalli, L.; Subrahmanyan, R.; Jones, D. H.; Duffy, A. R.; Rioja, M. (11 June 2013). "Giant radio galaxies – I. Intergalactic barometers". Monthly Notices of the Royal Astronomical Society. 432 (1): 200–224. arXiv:1303.4825. Bibcode:2013MNRAS.432..200M. doi:10.1093/mnras/stt471. ISSN 0035-8711.
- Correa, C. A.; Wyithe, J. S. B.; Schaye, J.; Duffy, A. R. (2014). "The physical origin of the universal accretion history of dark matter halos". Monthly Notices of the Royal Astronomical Society. 450 (2): 1514–1520. arXiv:1409.5228. Bibcode:2015MNRAS.450.1514C. doi:10.1093/mnras/stv689.
- Duffy, Alan R. (1 August 2014). "Probing the nature of dark energy through galaxy redshift surveys with radio telescopes". Annalen der Physik. 526 (7–8): 283–293. arXiv:1405.7465. Bibcode:2014AnP...526..283D. doi:10.1002/andp.201400059. ISSN 1521-3889. S2CID 118325934.
- Duffy, A. R.; Wyithe, J. S. B.; Mutch, S. J.; Poole, G. B. (1 October 2014). "Low-mass galaxy formation and the ionizing photon budget during reionization". Monthly Notices of the Royal Astronomical Society. 443 (4): 3435–3443. arXiv:1405.7459. Bibcode:2014MNRAS.443.3435D. doi:10.1093/mnras/stu1328. ISSN 0035-8711.
- Bernyk, Maksym; Croton, Darren J.; Tonini, Chiara; Hodkinson, Luke; Hassan, Amr H.; Garel, Thibault; Duffy, Alan R.; Mutch, Simon J.; Poole, Gregory B.; Hegarty, Sarah (2016). "The Theoretical Astrophysical Observatory: Cloud-based Mock Galaxy Catalogs". The Astrophysical Journal Supplement Series. 223 (1): 9. arXiv:1403.5270. Bibcode:2016ApJS..223....9B. doi:10.3847/0067-0049/223/1/9. ISSN 0067-0049. S2CID 118617098.

The accretion history of dark matter haloes – in three parts:

- Correa, C. A.; Wyithe, J. S. B.; Schaye, J.; Duffy, A. R. (21 June 2015). "The accretion history of dark matter haloes – I. The physical origin of the universal function". Monthly Notices of the Royal Astronomical Society. 450 (2): 1514–1520. arXiv:1409.5228. Bibcode:2015MNRAS.450.1514C. doi:10.1093/mnras/stv689. ISSN 0035-8711.
- Correa, C. A.; Wyithe, J. S. B.; Schaye, J.; Duffy, A. R. (21 June 2015). "The accretion history of dark matter haloes – II. The connections with the mass power spectrum and the density profile". Monthly Notices of the Royal Astronomical Society. 450 (2): 1521–1537. arXiv:1501.04382. Bibcode:2015MNRAS.450.1521C. doi:10.1093/mnras/stv697. ISSN 0035-8711.
- Correa, Camila A.; Wyithe, J. Stuart B.; Schaye, Joop; Duffy, Alan R. (11 September 2015). "The accretion history of dark matter haloes – III. A physical model for the concentration–mass relation". Monthly Notices of the Royal Astronomical Society. 452 (2): 1217–1232. arXiv:1502.00391. Bibcode:2015MNRAS.452.1217C. doi:10.1093/mnras/stv1363. ISSN 0035-8711.

Dark-ages Reionization and Galaxy formation simulation:

- Poole, Gregory B.; Angel, Paul W.; Mutch, Simon J.; Power, Chris; Duffy, Alan R.; Geil, Paul M.; Mesinger, Andrei; Wyithe, Stuart B. (1 July 2016). "Dark-ages Reionization and Galaxy formation simulation – I. The dynamical lives of high-redshift galaxies". Monthly Notices of the Royal Astronomical Society. 459 (3): 3025–3039. arXiv:1512.00559. Bibcode:2016MNRAS.459.3025P. doi:10.1093/mnras/stw674. hdl:1959.3/421514. ISSN 0035-8711.
- Angel, Paul W.; Poole, Gregory B.; Ludlow, Aaron D.; Duffy, Alan R.; Geil, Paul M.; Mutch, Simon J.; Mesinger, Andrei; Wyithe, J. Stuart B. (21 June 2016). "Dark-ages reionization and galaxy formation simulation – II. Spin and concentration parameters for dark matter haloes during the epoch of reionization". Monthly Notices of the Royal Astronomical Society. 459 (2): 2106–2117. arXiv:1512.00560. Bibcode:2016MNRAS.459.2106A. doi:10.1093/mnras/stw737. ISSN 0035-8711.
- Mutch, Simon J.; Geil, Paul M.; Poole, Gregory B.; Angel, Paul W.; Duffy, Alan R.; Mesinger, Andrei; Wyithe, J. Stuart B. (11 October 2016). "Dark-ages reionization and galaxy formation simulation – III. Modelling galaxy formation and the epoch of reionization". Monthly Notices of the Royal Astronomical Society. 462 (1): 250–276. arXiv:1512.00562. Bibcode:2016MNRAS.462..250M. doi:10.1093/mnras/stw1506. ISSN 0035-8711.
- Liu, Chuanwu; Mutch, Simon J.; Angel, P. W.; Duffy, Alan R.; Geil, Paul M.; Poole, Gregory B.; Mesinger, Andrei; Wyithe, J. Stuart B. (11 October 2016). "Dark-ages reionization and galaxy formation simulation – IV. UV luminosity functions of high-redshift galaxies". Monthly Notices of the Royal Astronomical Society. 462 (1): 235–249. arXiv:1512.00563. Bibcode:2016MNRAS.462..235L. doi:10.1093/mnras/stw1015. ISSN 0035-8711.
- Geil, Paul M.; Mutch, Simon J.; Poole, Gregory B.; Angel, Paul W.; Duffy, Alan R.; Mesinger, Andrei; Wyithe, J. Stuart B. (11 October 2016). "Dark-ages reionization and galaxy formation simulation V: morphology and statistical signatures of reionization". Monthly Notices of the Royal Astronomical Society. 462 (1): 804–817. arXiv:1512.00564. Bibcode:2016MNRAS.462..804G. doi:10.1093/mnras/stw1718. ISSN 0035-8711.
- Mutch, Simon J.; Liu, Chuanwu; Poole, Gregory B.; Geil, Paul M.; Duffy, Alan R.; Trenti, Michele; Oesch, Pascal A.; Illingworth, Garth D.; Mesinger, Andrei; Wyithe, J. Stuart B. (21 December 2016). "Dark-ages reionization and galaxy-formation simulation – VI. The origins and fate of the highest known redshift galaxy". Monthly Notices of the Royal Astronomical Society. 463 (4): 3556–3562. arXiv:1605.08054. Bibcode:2016MNRAS.463.3556M. doi:10.1093/mnras/stw2187. hdl:1959.3/423663. ISSN 0035-8711.
- Liu, Chuanwu; Mutch, Simon J.; Poole, Gregory B.; Angel, P. W.; Duffy, Alan R.; Geil, Paul M.; Mesinger, Andrei; Wyithe, J. Stuart B. (1 March 2017). "Dark-ages reionization and galaxy-formation simulation – VII. The sizes of high-redshift galaxies". Monthly Notices of the Royal Astronomical Society. 465 (3): 3134–3142. arXiv:1608.00819. Bibcode:2017MNRAS.465.3134L. doi:10.1093/mnras/stw2912. hdl:1959.3/435215. ISSN 0035-8711.
- Qin, Yuxiang; Duffy, Alan R.; Mutch, Simon J.; Poole, Gregory B.; Geil, Paul M.; Angel, Paul W.; Mesinger, Andrei; Wyithe, J. Stuart B. (21 May 2017). "Dark-ages Reionization & Galaxy Formation Simulation VIII. Suppressed growth of dark matter halos during the Epoch of Reionization". Monthly Notices of the Royal Astronomical Society. 467 (2) stx083. arXiv:1701.03538. Bibcode:2017MNRAS.467.1678Q. doi:10.1093/mnras/stx083. hdl:1959.3/436762. ISSN 0035-8711.
- Duffy, Alan R.; Mutch, Simon J.; Poole, Gregory B.; Geil, Paul M.; Kim, Han-Seek; Mesinger, Andrei; Wyithe, J. Stuart B. (21 September 2017). "Dark-ages reionization and galaxy formation simulation – IX. Economics of reionizing galaxies". Monthly Notices of the Royal Astronomical Society. 470 (3): 3300–3315. arXiv:1705.07255. Bibcode:2017MNRAS.470.3300D. doi:10.1093/mnras/stx1242. ISSN 0035-8711.
- Qin, Yuxiang; Mutch, Simon J.; Poole, Gregory B.; Liu, Chuanwu; Angel, Paul W.; Duffy, Alan R.; Geil, Paul M.; Mesinger, Andrei; Wyithe, J. Stuart B. (2017). "Dark-ages Reionization and Galaxy Formation Simulation – X. The small contribution of quasars to reionization". Monthly Notices of the Royal Astronomical Society. 472 (2): 2009. arXiv:1703.04895. Bibcode:2017MNRAS.472.2009Q. doi:10.1093/mnras/stx1909.
- Park, Jaehong; Kim, Han-Seek; Liu, Chuanwu; Trenti, M.; Duffy, Alan R.; Geil, Paul M.; Mutch, Simon J.; Poole, Gregory B.; Mesinger, Andrei; Wyithe, J. Stuart B. (15 March 2017). "Dark-ages reionization and galaxy formation simulation XI: Clustering and halo masses of high redshift galaxies". Monthly Notices of the Royal Astronomical Society. 472 (2): 1995. arXiv:1703.05419. Bibcode:2017MNRAS.472.1995P. doi:10.1093/mnras/stx1884.
- Geil, Paul M.; Mutch, Simon J.; Poole, Gregory B.; Duffy, Alan R.; Mesinger, Andrei; Wyithe, J. Stuart B. (2017). "Dark-ages reionization & galaxy formation simulation XII: Bubbles at dawn". Monthly Notices of the Royal Astronomical Society. 472 (2): 1324. arXiv:1704.05175. Bibcode:2017MNRAS.472.1324G. doi:10.1093/mnras/stx1841.
- Qin, Yuxiang; Mutch, Simon J.; Duffy, Alan R.; Geil, Paul M.; Poole, Gregory B.; Mesinger, Andrei; Wyithe, J. Stuart B. (11 April 2017). "Dark-ages Reionization and Galaxy Formation Simulation – XIII. AGN quenching of high redshift star formation in ZF-COSMOS-20115". Monthly Notices of the Royal Astronomical Society. 471 (4): 4345–4354. arXiv:1704.03274. Bibcode:2017MNRAS.471.4345Q. doi:10.1093/mnras/stx1852.
