= Fred Watson =

English astronomer (born 1944)

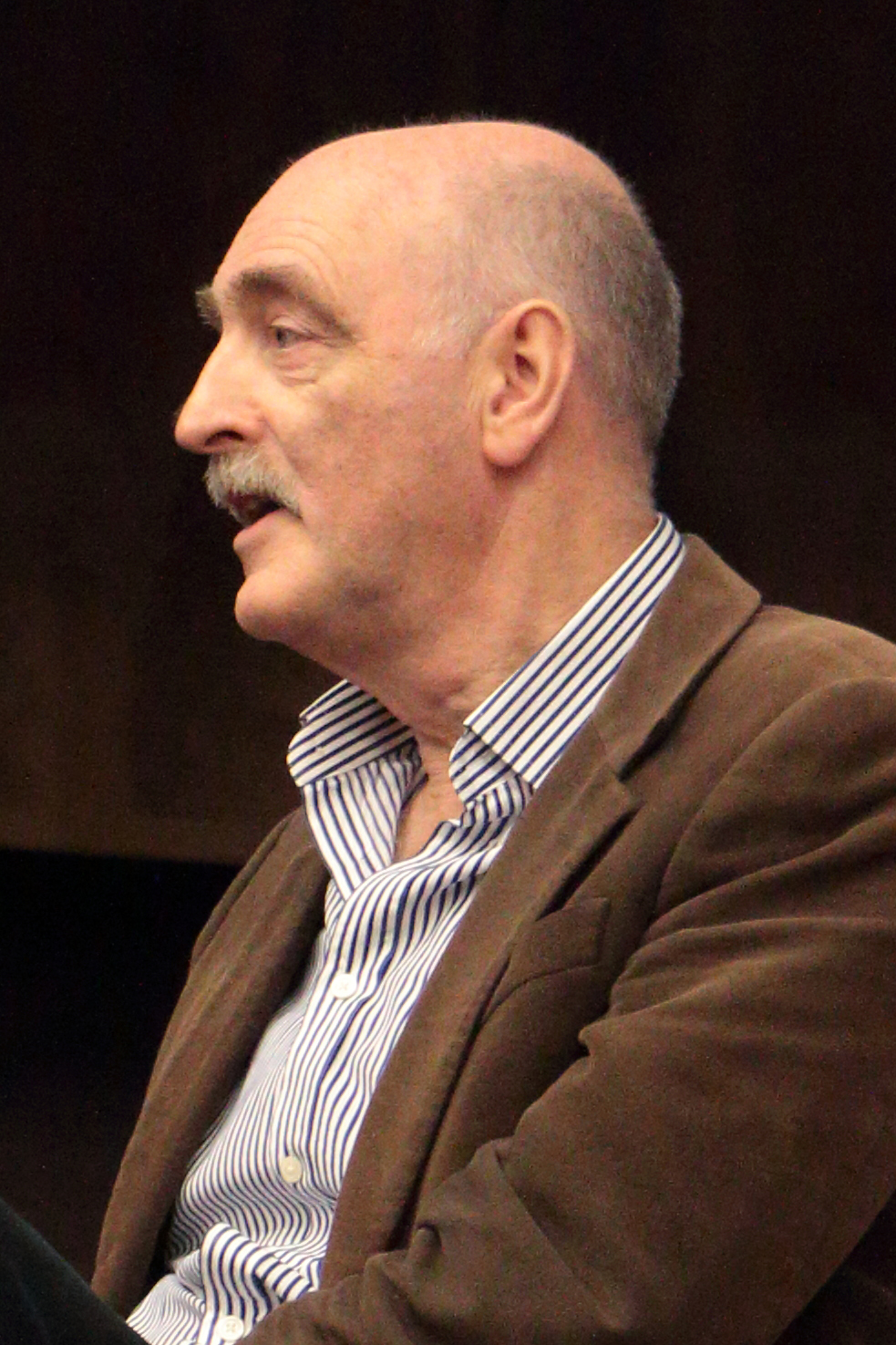
- Fred Watson answering a question at Macquarie University on 22 July 2014.
- Born: Bradford, West Riding of Yorkshire, England
- Education: University of St Andrews (BSc 1967, MSc 1975); University of Edinburgh (PhD 1987)
- Spouse: Marnie Ogg
- Scientific career
- Fields: Astronomy
- Workplaces: Australian Astronomical Observatory
- Thesis: Multi-Object Astronomical Spectroscopy with Optical Fibres (1987)
- Website: www.fredwatson.com.au

Frederick Garnett Watson AM (born 14 December 1944) is an English-born astronomer and popular scientist in Australia. He was appointed as Australia's First Astronomer at Large within the Commonwealth Government of Australia in 2018, relaying the important aspects of Australian astronomy to the government, the general public, and associated organisations. He stood down from this role in October 2024.

In 1995 Watson became astronomer in charge of the Australian Astronomical Observatory, but is best known for his work with science outreach, for which he has written many books, as well as musical and choral works. On top of his many nationwide radio slots with the ABC, Watson has also been a frequent guest on The Project. In January 2010, Watson was made a member of the Order of Australia for service to astronomy, particularly the promotion and popularisation of space science through public outreach.

== Early life ==
Watson was born in 1944 near Bradford, West Riding of Yorkshire in England, where he attended Belle Vue Boys' School. He completed his higher education at the University of St Andrews, Scotland, where he obtained a degree in mathematics and physics in 1967. In 1975 he completed his master's degree in astronomy at the St Andrews and gained his PhD from the University of Edinburgh in 1987.

Watson confesses developing "an early love of music", which he used to help pay for his studies by playing the guitar in folk clubs, and which he now applies in his work with Science Outreach.

== Career ==
=== Astronomy ===
In 2018, Watson was appointed as Australia's first Astronomer at Large, within the Australian Commonwealth Government Department of Industry, Science, Energy and Resources. This role combines observing the night sky and conveying its wonder to the general public.

Until 2016 Watson was the astronomer-in-charge and head of lighting and environment at the Australian Astronomical Observatory, a division of the Commonwealth Department of Industry and Science, which operates the Anglo-Australian and UK Schmidt telescopes on behalf of the astronomical community of Australia. To this end the observatory is part of, and is funded by, the Australian Government. Its function is to provide world-class observing facilities for Australian optical astronomers.

Watson's background is in observational astronomy, photonics, spectroscopy and instrumentation with research interests in large-scale spectroscopic surveys and the history of science. His current scientific activities centre around the RAVE survey, the GALAH galactic archaeology survey and the two forthcoming surveys – Taipan (galaxies) and FunnelWeb (stars).

Watson was the project manager for the Radial Velocity Experiment (RAVE), measuring the radial velocities and metallicities of up to 1 million stars in the Milky Way Galaxy and was active in developing instrumentation for this project by developing robotic wide-field fibre-optics systems for the 1.2 m UK Schmidt Telescope and the 4.2 m William Herschel Telescope.

The countries taking part in RAVE were Australia, Canada, Germany, France, Italy, the Netherlands, Slovenia, the UK and the US. Professor Matthias Steinmetz, director of the Leibnitz Astrophysical Institute at Potsdam in Germany, led the collaboration. The research team completed the project, which was aimed at learning where stars in our galaxy were born, and how the galaxy has grown and changed over time.

From 2003 the RAVE team collected data on the brightness, colour, distance and movements of almost half a million stars, revealing a 'dwarf' galaxy swallowed and shredded by our own galaxy, stars with unusual chemistry, and the way our galaxy wobbles. It has also re-weighed the galaxy.

The light from the stars was captured with optical fibres, precisely positioned by a robot. The robot picks up optical fibres, one by one, and places them on a metal plate in the telescope. Each fibre is in the right place to catch the light from a single star. By using many fibres, more than 100 stars can be studied at the same time. Travelling down the tiny glass threads, the starlight enters an instrument that spreads it out into its component wavelengths or 'colours', the way a prism does. These colours tell astronomers about the chemical elements a star contains and how it is moving. From that, the astronomers can work out how old the stars are, where they came from, and how they are related. And that's the key that unlocks the history of our Galaxy.

All this was achieved with the UK Schmidt Telescope (UKST). After the bushfire on 13 January 2014, and almost a decade of work, astronomers using the telescope finished writing the first chapter in the history of our galaxy.

Watson is an adjunct professor in the University of New South Wales, Western Sydney University, University of Southern Queensland and the Queensland University of Technology. He is also an honorary fellow at Macquarie University.

Other positions currently held:

- Honorary professor of astronomy, University of Southern Queensland
- Adjunct Professor, School of Physical and Chemical Sciences, Queensland University of Technology
- Adjunct Professor, James Cook University
- Board member of the New South Wales Foundation for Public Education
- Member of the Education Advisory Group of the Australian Square Kilometre Array Steering Committee
- Chair Siding Spring Dark Sky Committee
- Member of the AAO executive
- Member of the RAVE executive board
- Member of the 6dF Galaxy Survey project team
- Chair of the Siding Spring Dark Skies Working Group (since 1999)
- Chair of LOCs for various conferences and workshops (2005–14)
- Member of the National Organising Committee for the International Year of Light 2015
- 6dF robotic fibre system project scientist (1998–2001); Ukidna co-project scientist (2003)
- Support astronomer on the AAT and UKST

=== Patronages ===
- Astronomer-at-Large, Australian Government, Department of Industry, Science, Energy and Resources.
- Adjunct Professor University of Sydney
- Adjunct Professor University of New South Wales
- Adjunct Professor University of Southern Queensland
- Adjunct Professor Western Sydney University
- Adjunct Professor University of Wollongong
- Honorary Fellow, Macquarie University
- Mind in Residence, Questacon, Canberra
- Patron, Australasian Dark Sky Alliance
- Patron, Great Melbourne Telescope Restoration Project
- Patron, Sutherland Astronomical Society Inc.
- Patron, Port Macquarie Astronomical Association Inc.
- Patron, Macquarie University Observatory

=== Science outreach ===
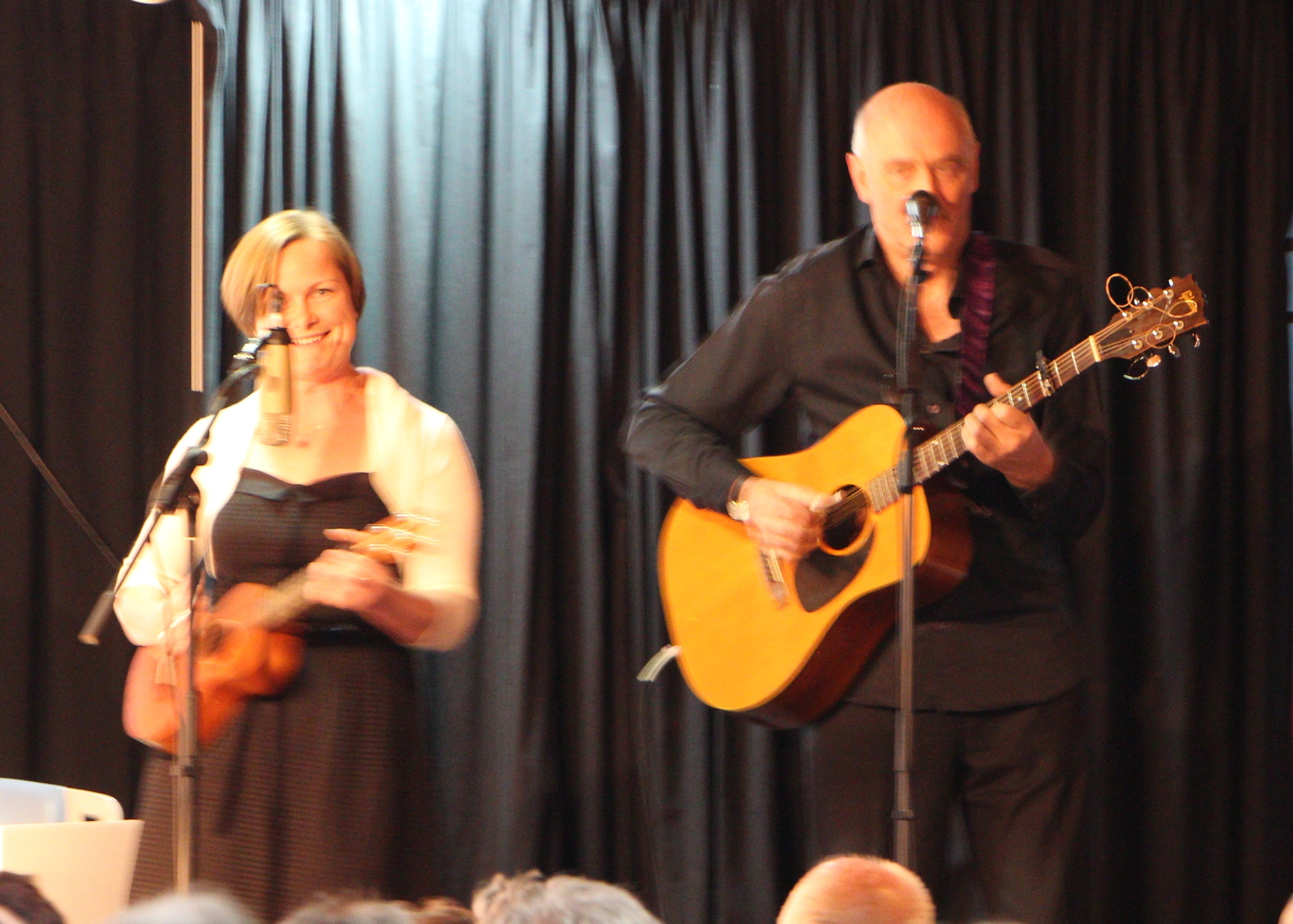
Outreach is hard work. Fred Watson (on guitar) and Amanda Bauer (on ukulele) provide a musical interlude at the 2014 celebrations of the 40th anniversary of the AAT.

Watson averages 250 radio and TV broadcasts, 60 popular-level talks and several popular-level articles per year. His radio work is based around weekly segments and other guest slots, with commentaries on astronomy and space news. TV segments include regular appearances on ABC News 24 and The Project (Channel 10).

TV highlights include the "retrial" of Galileo on Compass (ABC 1, 2010), and a much-publicised 60 Minutes segment on the Large Hadron Collider (Nine Network, 2012).

Talks have included the AAO/ANU Bart Bok Lecture (1996), the Australian Institute of Physics Youth Lecture Series, Western Australia, Queensland and Tasmania (2001–02), the AAO Allison Levick Lecture (Birmingham, UK, 2005), and the Peter Canisius Public Lecture (Buffalo, NY, 2005). Frequent talks have been given at USQ, QUT, UNSW, UWS, the Australian Museum, Australian Geographic, NSW Education Department, Royal Institution of Australia, etc. Other appearances include the Adelaide Writers’ Festival, 2009, the Sydney Writers' Festival, 2008, 2010 and 2013, the Melbourne Writers' Festival, 2013, TEDx events (Macquarie University 2012, QUT 2013 and Pittwater 2014), and on board MV Sun Princess (2012). The Fred Watson Presents... series of popular science talks in Sydney began in 2014, and have continued in 2015.

He has also written a wide cross-section of the public read articles written by Watson in Australian Geographic, and Sir Patrick Moore's Yearbook of Astronomy in the UK (1995-2013 yearbooks, except 1997 edition).

=== Podcast ===
Since 2016, Watson has been a regular podcaster with the ex-ABC presenter, Andrew Dunkley, on the astronomy-themed show "SpaceNuts". This podcast has over 1 million downloads each year and covers all things related to space – news, travel, discoveries, mysteries and more.

=== Awards ===
- 2003 David Allen Prize from the Astronomical Society of Australia "for communicating astronomy to the public"
- 2004 asteroid 5691 was named "Fredwatson" in his honour by the International Astronomical Union (although he is always at pains to point out that if it hits the Earth, it won't be his fault)
- 2005 Warrumbungle Shire's Coonabarabran Citizen of the Year
- 2005 Rotary NSW Northern District Award for Vocational Excellence
- 2006 Australian Museum Eureka Prize for Science Communication
- 2008 Queensland Literary Prize for Science Writing for Why is Uranus Upside Down? and Other Questions About the Universe
- 2010 Member of the Order of Australia "for service to astronomy, particularly the promotion and popularisation of space science through public outreach".
- 2013 Bragg UNSW Press Prize for Science Writing for Here come the ubernerds: Planets, Pluto and Prague (from Star-Craving Mad: Tales from a travelling astronomer, Allen & Unwin)
- Fellow of the Royal Astronomical Society.
- APRA Choral Work of the Year award for his contribution on Star Chant, a choral symphony by the Australian composer Ross Edwards, which also used celestial images by David Malin, and premiered at the Adelaide Festival in 2002

=== Books ===
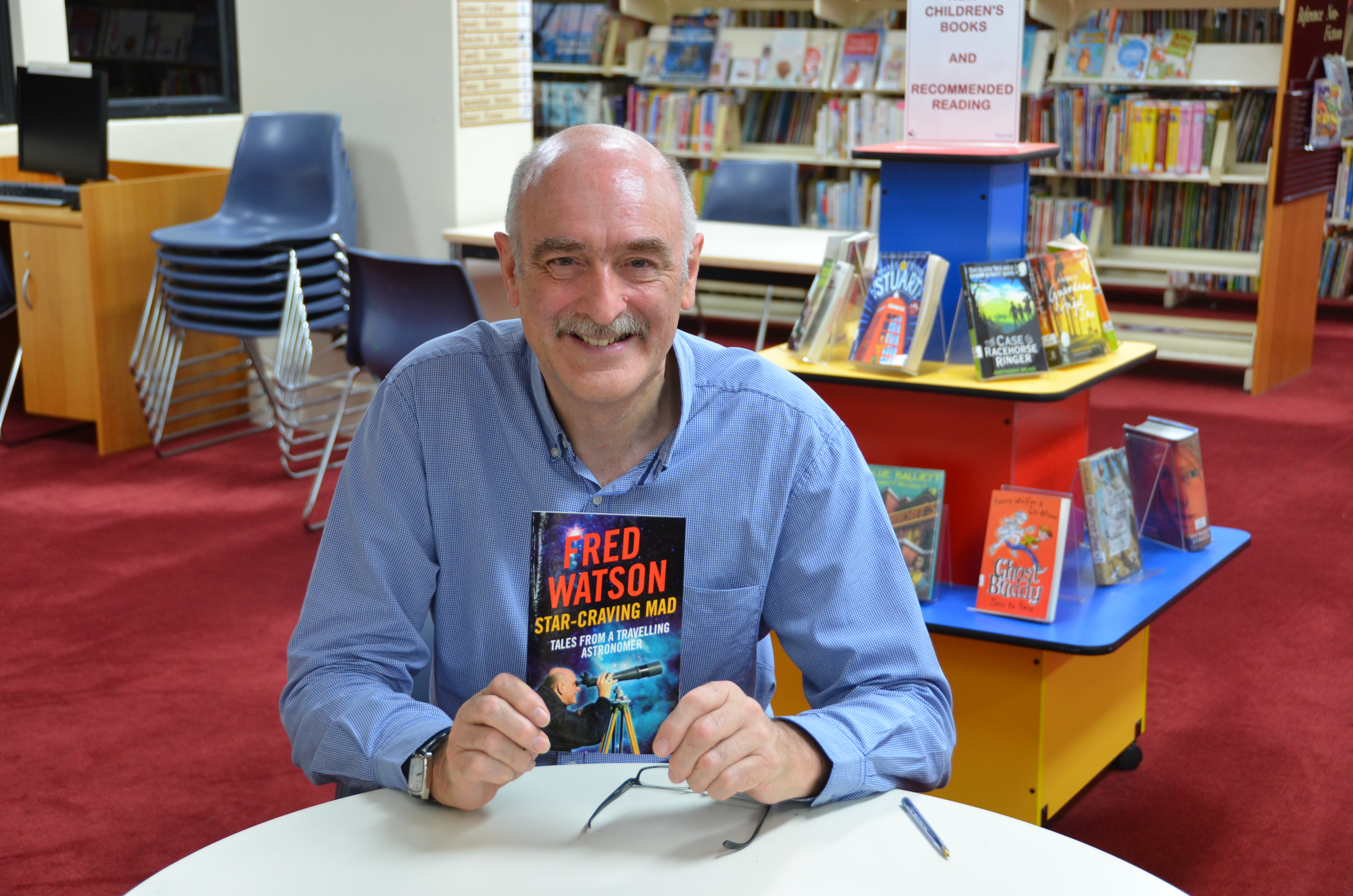
Fred Watson in 2013

Watson has written several popular science books. In 2022, his childhood passion for drawing led him to transition from publishing books for adults, to not only write but illustrate a children's book entitled Spacewarp, Colliding Stars and other Cosmic Catastrophes.

- Binoculars, Opera Glasses and Field Glasses, published by Shire Album
- Stargazer, the Life and Times of the Telescope, published by Allen & Unwin, with versions available in America, The Netherlands, Korea, and most recently Japan
- "Universe", published by HarperCollins
- Why is Uranus Upside Down?, published by Allen & Unwin, with a UK version published by Summersdale; received the 2008 Queensland Literary Prize for Science Writing
- Star-Craving Mad: Tales from a travelling astronomer, published by Allen & Unwin
- Cosmic Chronicles, published by NSW Publishing
- Spacewarp, Colliding Stars and other Cosmic Catastrophes, a children's book published by NSW Publishing

Papers and articles: List of 300 publications. About half are specialist technical and research papers, and the remainder popular-level articles (including the regular 'Space' column in Australian Geographic since 2005).

=== Music ===
- Watson has collaborated with composer Michael Sollis and the Griffyn Ensemble to perform Urmas Sisask's Southern Sky. and to compose Northern Lights
- Star Chant is a collaboration with Australian composer Ross Edwards. This was the fourth choral symphony written by Edwards, for which Watson wrote the libretto. As a multi-media work, celestial images by David Malin are included. Star Chant premiered at the Adelaide Festival in March 2002, and has also been performed at the Sydney Opera House.
  Star Chant received several awards, including 2008 APRA award for the Choral work of the Year.
- An Alien Like You (2009) is a light-hearted look at the Universe with excerpts from the book Why is Uranus upside down? with Fred playing folk guitar and singing.
- Watson contributed the libretto for a further Edwards choral piece, Mountain Chant, which was first performed by the Melbourne Chorale in June 2003.

=== Travelling ===
Since 2007, Watson has been a special guest and key instigator in astronomy tourism ventures. This provides a new vehicle for engaging the public in science is tourism. While taking leave from AAO Fred has led the following tours:When the Stones Speak—An Archaeoastronomy Tour of Peru, Oct/Nov 2007

· Stargazer—the birth of the telescope, UK, Netherlands, Denmark, Italy, Sept/Oct 2008

· Guide to the Southern Skies aboard MV Orion in Indonesia and the Kimberley, Jun/Jul 2009

· Stargazer II3/4Kepler to Collider, Germany, Czech Rep., Switzerland, France, May/Jun 2010

· Fire in the Sky aurora borealis tour, Norway, Sweden, Denmark, Iceland, Jan 2012

· Spirits in the Sky aurora tour, Finland, Estonia, Norway, Sweden, Denmark, Feb 2012

· In the Face of the Sun Venus transit tour, Canberra, Parkes, Coonabarabran, June 2012

· Australian Eclipse Queensland total eclipse tour, Palm Cove, Maitland Downs, Nov 2012

· Fire in the Sky II aurora borealis tour, Sweden, Norway, Iceland, Denmark, Jan 2013

· Southern Sky Safari astro/wildlife, S. Africa, Namibia, Botswana, Zimbabwe, May 2013

· Night Sky Dreaming outback history tour, Victoria, NSW, Aug 2013

· Discovery Recovery post Wambelong Fire NSW telescope tour, Oct 2013

· Hawaiian Fire + New Mexico – New Horizons, USA tours, Apr 2014

· Starfest NSW telescope tour, Oct 2014

· SAMI Skies aurora borealis tour of Sweden and Norway, Nov 2014

· Astromusica tour of southern Norway, Latvia, Estonia, Finland, Dec 2014

· Einstein Equations, France, Germany, Switzerland + Faroes Eclipse, Mar 2015

· Gravitating to Galápagos, Chile, Ecuador, Galápagos, Oct 2015

· Flocking to Lord Howe Feb/Mar 2016

· Craic Expectations (Eire) Aug 2016 + Great British Thinkers (UK) Aug/Sep 2016

· SAMI Skies II (aurora tour, Arctic Norway, Sweden, Iceland) Feb 2017

· US Eclipse, California, Wyoming, Aug 2017

· Omazing Oman, Oman, Mar 2018 + Egypt and the Ancient Sky, Egypt, Mar 2018

· South American Eclipse, Argentina, Brazil, Patagonia + Atacama Highlights, Jun/Jul 2019

· Sky & Telescope and Starfest, NSW telescope tour, Oct 2019

· Aurora New Year, Arctic Norway, Sweden, Dec 2019/Jan 2020

· Alpine to Coast, NSW Alpine Region and south coast, Oct 2020

== Published works ==
=== Books ===
- Watson, Fred (2013). Star-craving mad: Tales from a travelling astronomer. Crows Nest, NSW: Allen & Unwin.
- Watson, Fred (2019). Cosmic chrohicles: A user's guide to the universe. Sydney, NSW: NewSouth.

=== Articles ===
- Watson, Fred (May–June 2014). "Ancient star power". Space. Australian Geographic. 120: 22.
