= Pauline Barmby =

Canadian astronomer

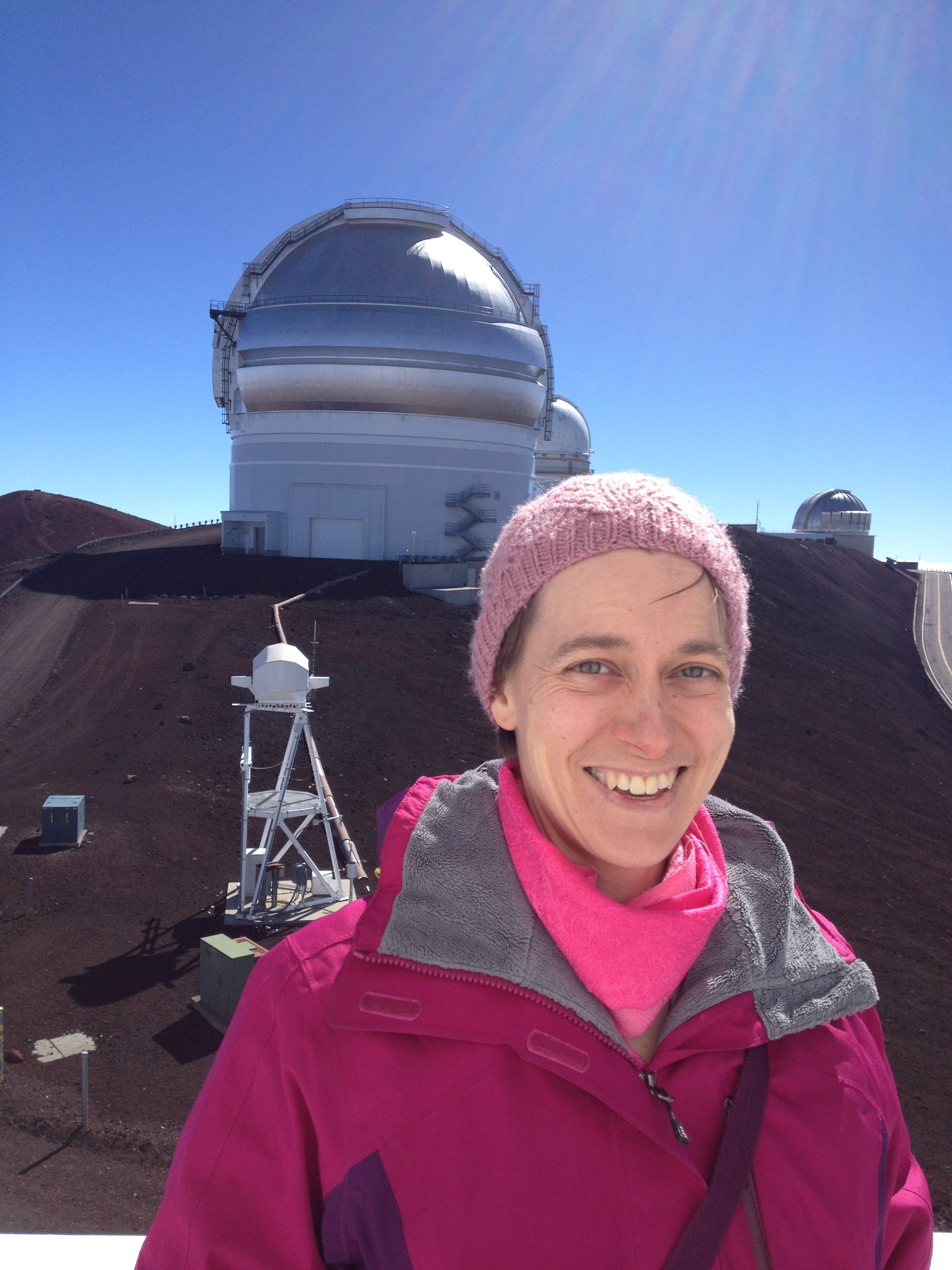
- Pauline Barmby with Gemini-North Telescope
- Born: 1972
- Citizenship: Canada
- Scientific career
- Fields: Astrophysics
- Institutions: The University of Western Ontario
- Thesis: Globular Clusters in the Andromeda Galaxy (2001)
- Academic advisors: John P. Huchra

Pauline Barmby (born 1972) is a Canadian astronomer currently based at the University of Western Ontario. She studies galaxies, their formation and evolution from an observational standpoint. She studies both nearby galaxies and those at high redshift using telescopes like the Spitzer Space Telescope. She is the co-chair, with Bryan Gaensler, of the Canadian Astronomy 2020 Long Range Plan.

== Education ==
Barmby obtained her undergraduate degree from the University of British Columbia in 1995. She received a master's degree in astronomy from Harvard University in 1998, and a PhD degree from Harvard in 2001. Her thesis work was on globular clusters in the Andromeda Galaxy, and her supervisor was John P. Huchra.

== Career ==
From 2001 to 2007, Barmby was an astrophysicist at the Smithsonian Astrophysical Observatory, where she was a member of the Spitzer/IRAC telescope team. She became an assistant professor in the Department of Physics and Astronomy and the University of Western Ontario in 2007, and was promoted to associate professor in 2013 and full professor in 2019. She served as associate dean of graduate and postdoctoral studies in the Faculty of Science at Western, and was the Acting Dean of Science in 2017.

== Research ==
Barmby focuses her scientific investigations on nearby galaxies like the Andromeda galaxy (M31) and other galaxies in our Local Group. She studies various regions within these local galaxies, including star-forming regions and related star formation laws and X-ray emitting star clusters. She studies polycyclic aromatic hydrocarbons in these galaxies. Her work focuses on astronomical 'big data', and she is active in public outreach about astronomy.

== Honours and awards ==
- Florence Bucke Prize, Western University (2014)
- University of Western Ontario Faculty of Science Outreach Award (2010) for the Western Astronomy Group
- Ontario Early Researcher Award (2008)
- NASA Group Achievement Award to the Spitzer Space Telescope Payload Team (2004)
- Margaret Weyerhauser Jewett Memorial Fellowship (1996)
- Canada Scholar (1990–1995)
