= Ronald Ekers =

Australian radio astronomer (born 1941)

Ron Ekers AO
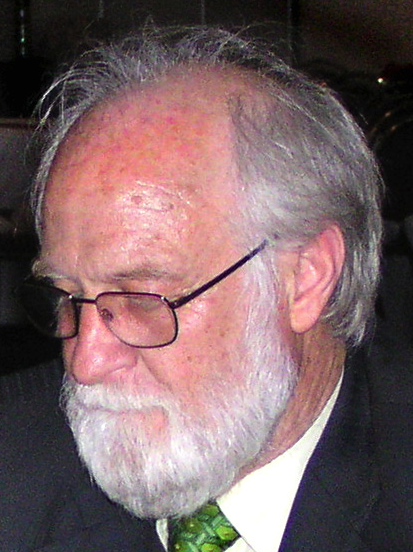
- Ekers at the General Assembly of the International Astronomical Union in August 2006.
- Born: 18 September 1941 (age 84); Victor Harbor, South Australia
- Education: University of Adelaide; Australian National University
- Awards: Fellow of the Royal Society (2005); Fellow of the Australian Academy of Science, 1993; Centenary Medal (Australia), 2003; Matthew Flinders Medal and Lecture (Australian Academy of Science), 2005
- Scientific career
- Fields: Astrophysics
- Workplaces: ATNF; VLA
- Doctoral advisor: John Gatenby Bolton
- Notable students: Melanie Johnston-Hollitt
- Website: www.atnf.csiro.au/people/rekers

Ronald David Ekers AO (born 18 September 1941) FRS FAA is an Australian radio astronomer. His fields of specialty include the study of active galactic nuclei, cosmology, and radio astronomy techniques.

Ron Ekers was born in Victor Harbor, South Australia. He showed interest in astronomy at a young age.

Ron Ekers graduated from the University of Adelaide in 1963 and received his PhD in astronomy at the Australian National University (ANU) in 1967. His postdoctoral supervisor at ANU was the astronomer John Gatenby Bolton. After graduating from ANU, his first postdoctoral studies were performed at Caltech, during which time Richard P. Feynman and Fred Hoyle were active.

He was director of the Very Large Array (VLA) from 1980 until 1987. From 1988 to 2003 he was foundation director of CSIRO's Australia Telescope National Facility. In 2002 he was awarded a prestigious Federation Fellowship. He is a past president of the International Astronomical Union (IAU) (2003–2006) and a member of the advisory board for the Peter Gruber Foundation Cosmology Prize.

== Honours and awards ==
He was elected a Fellow of the Australian Academy of Science, a Foreign Member of the Royal Netherlands Academy of Arts and Sciences in 1993, a Foreign Member of the American Philosophical Society in 2003, a Fellow of the Royal Society in 2005, and a Foreign Associate of the US National Academy of Sciences in 2018.

- 2014 Grote Reber Gold Medal for innovative and significant contributions to radio astronomy
- 2005 Matthew Flinders Medal and Lecture, Australian Academy of Science
- 1993 Centenary Medal (Australia)

== Publications ==
Ekers has published over 460 academic papers and has an h-index of 79.

He has also published the following books:

- "Joe Pawsey and the Founding of Australian Radio Astronomy", by W.M. Goss, Clair Hooker, and Ronald D. Ekers (2023).
- "The Square Kilometre Array: A Science Mega-Project in the Making, 1990-2012", by Richard T. Schilizzi, Ronald D. Ekers, Peter E. Dewdney, and Philip Crosby (2024)
- "SETI 2020: A Roadmap for the Search for Extraterrestrial Intelligence" by Ronald D. Ekers, D. Kent Cullers, and John Billingham (2002)
