= Richard Hunstead =

Australian astronomer (1943–2020)

- Born: Richard Waller Hunstead; 30 May 1943; Sydney, Australia
- Died: 30 January 2020 (aged 76); Sydney, Australia
- Education: The University of Sydney
- Known for: Scintillation
- Scientific career
- Fields: Astronomy • astrophysics
- Workplaces: The University of Sydney

Richard Waller Hunstead (30 May 1943 – 30 January 2020) was a member and former head of the Sydney Institute for Astronomy (SIfA) and the Director of the Molonglo Observatory Synthesis Telescope (MOST), within the University of Sydney. He was known for his work in the field of quasars and radio galaxies. In 1995, he was awarded the Robert Ellery Lectureship of the Astronomical Society of Australia in recognition of his outstanding contributions in astronomy. One of 33 Australian Science Citation Laureates (of which only nine are astronomers), he was the author of multiple high impact papers which are frequently cited by other scientists around the world. The minor planet 171429 Hunstead is named in his honour.

Hunstead's most notable achievements included the discovery of the variability of radio sources at low frequencies, resulting in a large number of related research projects, conferences and workshops internationally, and his research into the redshift evolution of the Lyman alpha absorption forest. Hunstead’s work on the Lyman alpha forest resolved much of the confusion surrounding the nature of the cloud population responsible for these absorption lines, by confirming that their comoving number density does indeed evolve with redshift. He also contributed to our understanding of the metallicity, dust content and star formation rate in high redshift galaxies from his comprehensive study of damped Lyman alpha systems. This subsequently motivated interest in galaxy formation and evolution. More recently, he was involved in a study that showed radio loud quasars have distinct spectroscopic signatures that depend on their orientation and size. In his final years, he led an international team to locate and study the first massive galaxies formed in the Universe.

== Education ==
Hunstead attended North Sydney Boys High School, on the North Shore of Sydney, graduating in 1960. In 1963, he graduated from Sydney University with a B.Sc (Hons) and in 1972, completed his PhD titled "Studies of selected radio sources" with Bernard Mills as his supervisor, also at Sydney University. He was appointed to the faculty of the University of Sydney in 1974, where he remained until his death.
