= Bryan Gaensler =

Australian astronomer

Bryan Malcolm Gaensler
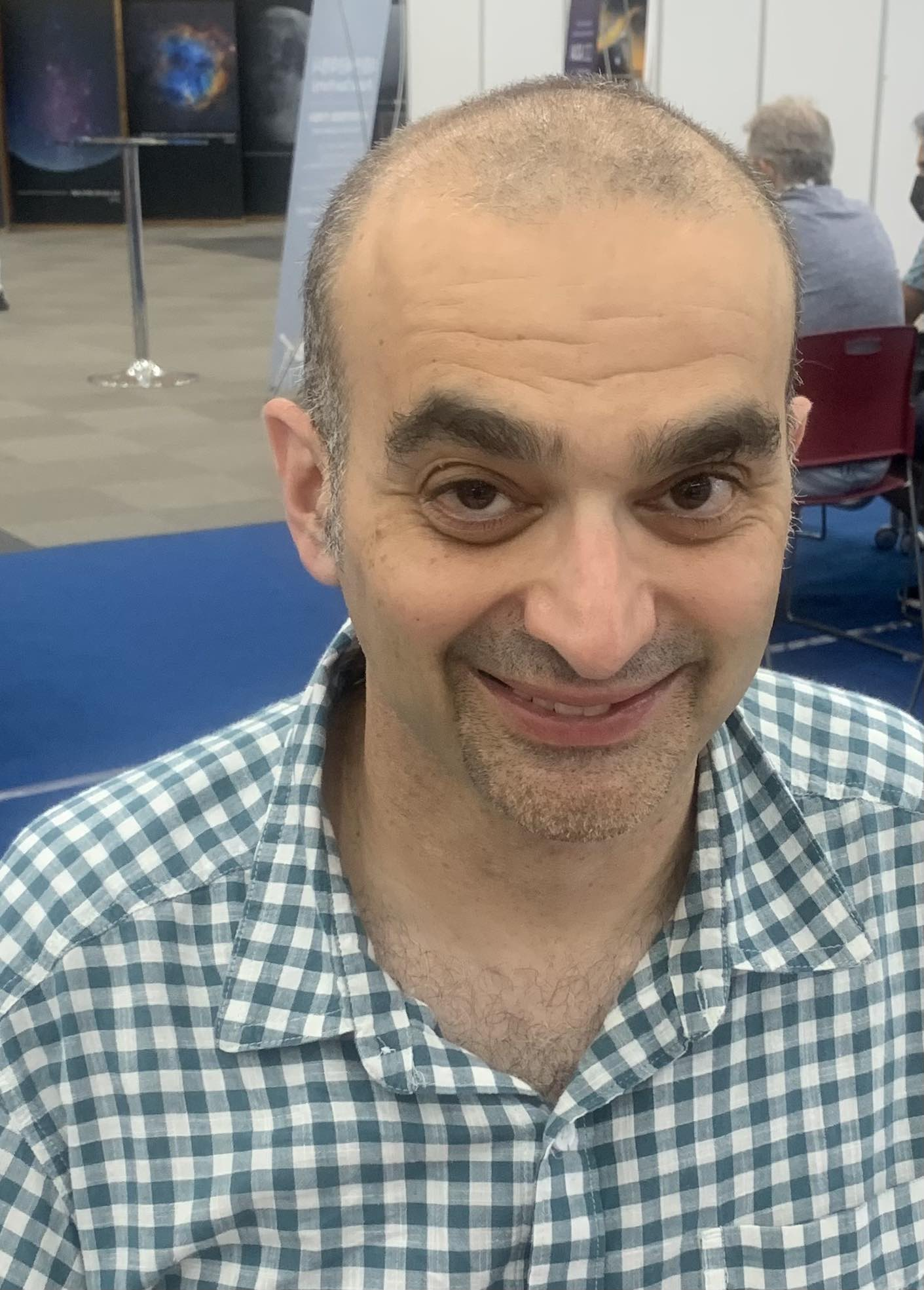
- Bryan Gaensler, August 2022
- Born: 1973 (age 52–53); Sydney, Australia
- Education: University of Sydney
- Children: 1
- Awards: Young Australian of the Year; Australian Laureate Fellowship (2010)
- Scientific career
- Fields: Physics (astrophysics)
- Workplaces: University of California, Santa Cruz

Bryan Malcolm Gaensler (born 1973) is an Australian astronomer based at the University of California, Santa Cruz. He studies magnetars, supernova remnants, and magnetic fields. In 2014, he was appointed as Director of the Dunlap Institute for Astronomy & Astrophysics at the University of Toronto, after James R. Graham's departure. He was the co-chair of the Canadian 2020 Long Range Plan Committee with Pauline Barmby. In 2023, he was appointed as Dean of Physical and Biological Sciences at UC Santa Cruz.

== Education ==
Gaensler was born in Sydney, Australia. He attended Sydney Grammar School, and studied at the University of Sydney, graduating with a BSc with first class honours in physics (1995), followed by a PhD in astrophysics (1999). His PhD thesis was completed under the supervision of Anne Green and Richard Manchester.

== Career ==
From 1998 to 2001, Gaensler held a Hubble Fellowship at the Center for Space Research of the Massachusetts Institute of Technology. In 2001 he moved to the Smithsonian Astrophysical Observatory as a Clay Fellow. In 2002, he took up an appointment as an assistant professor in the Department of Astronomy at Harvard University.

In 2006, he moved back to Sydney as an Australian Research Council Federation Fellow in the School of Physics at the University of Sydney and in 2011 he was also appointed Director of the ARC Centre of Excellence for All-Sky Astrophysics (CAASTRO). In June 2014, Gaensler announced that he would be leaving CAASTRO and taking up a position as director of the Dunlap Institute for Astronomy and Astrophysics at The University of Toronto commencing in January 2015.

Gaensler was Editor-in-Chief of Publications of the Astronomical Society of Australia from 2009 to 2014. His contributions to PASA included redefining the scope of the journal to move away from accepting conference summaries and "intermediate results", moving to Cambridge University Press as publisher, and introducing the Dawes Reviews, named after early Australian astronomer of William Dawes.

== Research ==
In 1997, Gaensler showed that many supernova remnants are aligned with the magnetic field of the Milky Way like "cosmic compasses". In 2000, he and Dale Frail calculated that some pulsars are much older than previously believed. In 2004, Gaensler used the Chandra X-ray Observatory to make the first detailed study of the behavior of high-energy particles around a fast moving pulsar.

In 2005, Gaensler was reported to have solved the mystery of why some supernova explosions form magnetars while others form ordinary pulsars. Later that year, he and his colleagues observed one of the brightest explosions ever observed in the history of astronomy, resulting from a sudden pulse of gamma rays from the magnetar SGR 1806-20. Also in 2005, he reported puzzling new observations of the Large Magellanic Cloud, showing that powerful but unknown forces were at work in maintaining this galaxy's magnetic field.

Gaensler was formerly the international project scientist for the Square Kilometre Array, a next-generation radio telescope. He is a member of the SKA Magnetism Science Working Group.

== Public outreach ==
In 2011, Gaensler published his first book, Extreme Cosmos.

== Personal ==
Gaensler married Laura Beth Bugg.

== Honours and awards ==
- Hubble Fellow at the Center for Space Research of the Massachusetts Institute of Technology (1998-2001)
- Young Australian of the Year (1999)
- Gave the Australia Day Address (2001)
- Clay Fellow, Smithsonian Astrophysical Observatory (2001)
- Alfred P. Sloan Research Fellow (2005)
- Australian Research Council Federation Fellow (2005)
- Newton Lacy Pierce Prize in Astronomy (2006)
- Australian Research Council Australian Laureate Fellow (2010)
- Pawsey Medal (2011)
- Elected a Fellow of the Australian Academy of Science (2013)
- Scopus Young Researcher of The Year Award - Physical Science (2013)

Preceded by Tan Le	Young Australian of the Year; 1999	Succeeded by Ian Thorpe
