= Ruth Grützbauch =

Austrian astronomer, planetarium director and science communicator

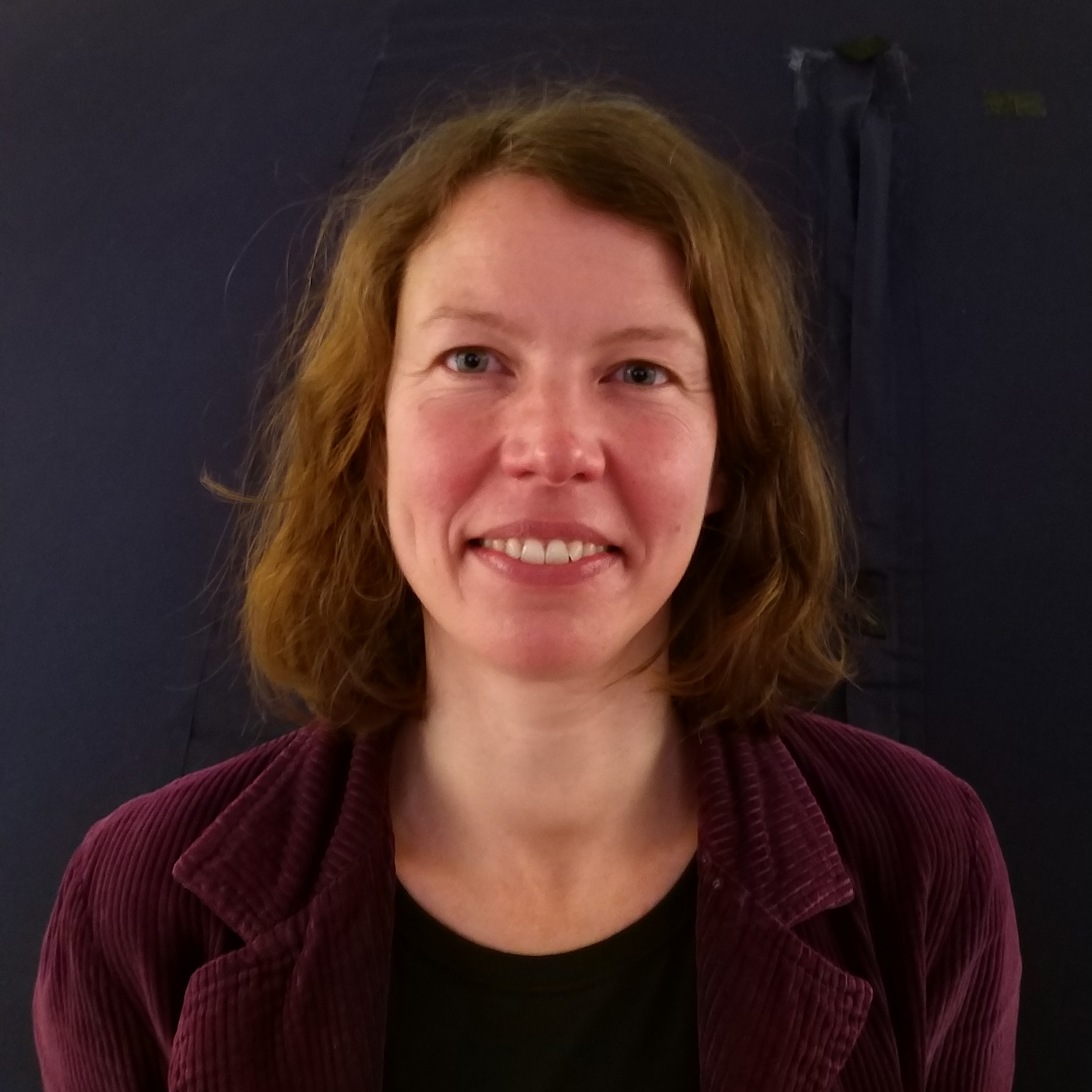
- Grützbauch in 2022
- Pronunciation: IPA: [ʁuːt ˈɡʁʏt͡sˌbaʊ̯x]
- Born: 3 October 1978 (age 48); Vienna, Austria
- Education: University of Vienna (PhD, 2007)
- Known for: Public Space, the pop-up planetarium
- Scientific career
- Fields: Extragalactic astronomy
- Workplaces: University of Vienna; University of Nottingham; University of Lisbon
- Website: publicspace.at

Ruth Grützbauch (born 3 October 1978) is an Austrian astronomer, planetarium director and science communicator. After earning her doctoral degree in 2007, she conducted extragalactic research until 2013, and worked as an educator and science communicator afterwards. Since 2017, she runs the Public Space pop-up planetarium.

== Biography ==
Grützbauch was born as the youngest of six children in the Viennese district of Währing and completed her Matura at a school in Simmering. In 1996, she began to study astronomy at the University of Vienna and obtained her diploma in 2003. During her subsequent doctorate, she gained international experience at the University of Nottingham in England, the Padua Observatory in Italy, and the La Silla Observatory in Chile. In 2007, she was awarded the academic degree Dr. rer. nat. after completing her dissertation on dwarf galaxies.

As a postdoc, Grützbauch did extragalactic research at the University of Nottingham and the University of Lisbon, and observed at the United Kingdom Infrared Telescope in Hawaii. Her h-index is at least 26. In 2013, Grützbauch ended her academic career and became an environmental educator. From 2015 to 2017, she worked as a science communicator at the Jodrell Bank Discovery Centre.

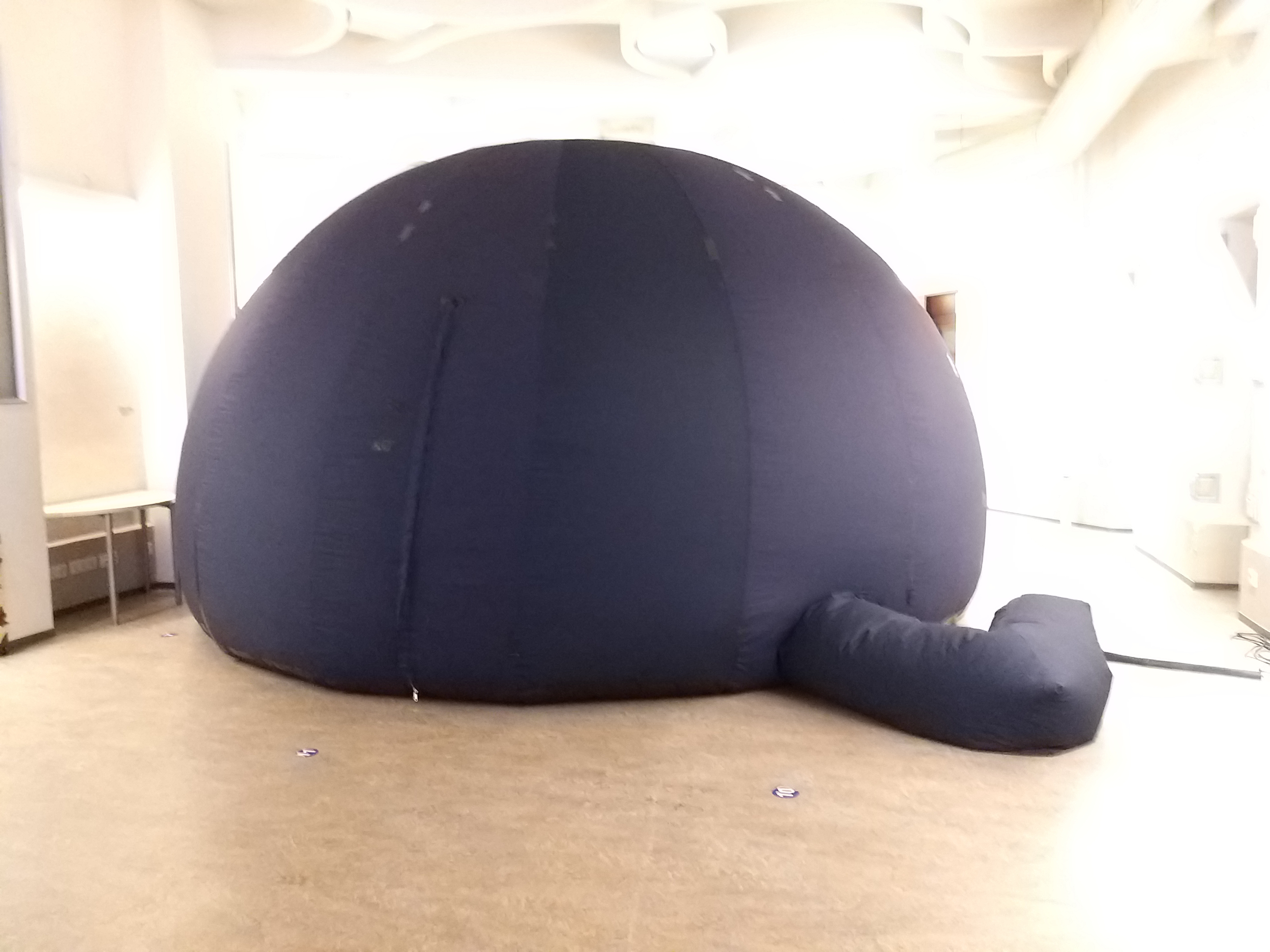
Public Space, the pop-up planetarium

Grützbauch has been known to a broader public since 2017 through her planetarium, Public Space. The inflatable planetarium does not have a fixed location, but is transported by Grützbauch with a cargo bike from her home in Vienna to schools and other event locations.

Since 2020, Grützbauch hosts the astronomy podcast Das Universum (English: The Universe) together with celestial mechanic Florian Freistetter. She publishes a different podcast series on the night sky together with Holger Klein.

In 2021, she published Per Lastenrad durch die Galaxis (English: The Cargo Cyclist's Guide to the Galaxy), a popular science book on extragalactic astronomy and her planetarium.

Grützbauch is part of the Science Busters, a science kabarett group founded by Heinz Oberhummer, Martin Puntigam and Werner Gruber. She had worked in their prop department since 2018 and made her stage debut in 2021.

== Works ==
- Per Lastenrad durch die Galaxis. Berlin: Aufbau-Verlag. 2021. ISBN 978-3-351-03893-9.
- The eventful life of galaxies in low density environments or Evolution of galaxy groups (PhD thesis). University of Vienna. 2007.
- Galaxien in isolierten Gruppen: Eigenschaften der Gruppenmitglieder und Signaturen gravitativer Wechselwirkungen (Master thesis). University of Vienna. 2003.
