= Astronomical Society of Australia =

Professional body of astronomers in Australia

The Astronomical Society of Australia (ASA) is the professional body representing astronomers in Australia. Established in 1966, it is incorporated in the Australian Capital Territory. Membership of the ASA is open to people "capable of contributing to the advancement of astronomy or a closely related field". This means that the members are mainly active professional astronomers and postgraduate students. Some retired astronomers and distinguished amateur astronomers are also members, and several organisations are corporate members of the society. The ASA currently has around 600 members. It publishes a peer-reviewed journal, Publications of the Astronomical Society of Australia.

== History ==
At its establishment in 1966, notable astronomer Ben Gascoigne was its first vice-president.

== Activities ==
The society currently has four topical interest groups:

- the Australian National Institute for Theoretical Astrophysics (ANITA), a virtual institute which aims to raise the profile of Australian theoretical astrophysics.
- the Education and Public Outreach Committee (EPOC), dedicated to advancing the level of public awareness of astronomy.
- Women in Astronomy chapter
- Early Career Researcher chapter

The ASA is trustee of the Foundation for the Advancement of Astronomy (FAA), a tax-deductible foundation intended to enhance the ASA's efforts to promote astronomy and related fields in Australia, and to recognise and support excellence in those fields. The purposes of the FAA are very broadly defined, allowing its support of prizes, scholarships, research and facilities.

=== Prizes and awards ===
The ASA sponsors the following prizes and awards:

- The Bok Prize for outstanding research in astronomy by an honours or eligible masters student.
- The Charlene Heisler Prize for the most outstanding PhD thesis in astronomy or a closely related field.
- The David Allen Prize for exceptional achievement in astronomy communication.
- The Louise Webster Prize for outstanding research by a scientist early in their post-doctoral career.
- The Ellery Lectureship for outstanding contributions in astronomy or related fields.
- The Berenice and Arthur Page Medal for excellence in amateur astronomy.

== Professional publications ==
The ASA's journal is the Publications of the Astronomical Society of Australia (PASA), for which the editor-in-chief is Bryan Gaensler. PASA is an ISI-listed, fully refereed electronic-only journal for new and significant research in astrophysics, and is published on behalf of the society by Cambridge University Press.

== See also ==
- List of telescopes of Australia
- List of astronomical societies
