= Bärbel Koribalski =

German astrophysicist (born 1964)

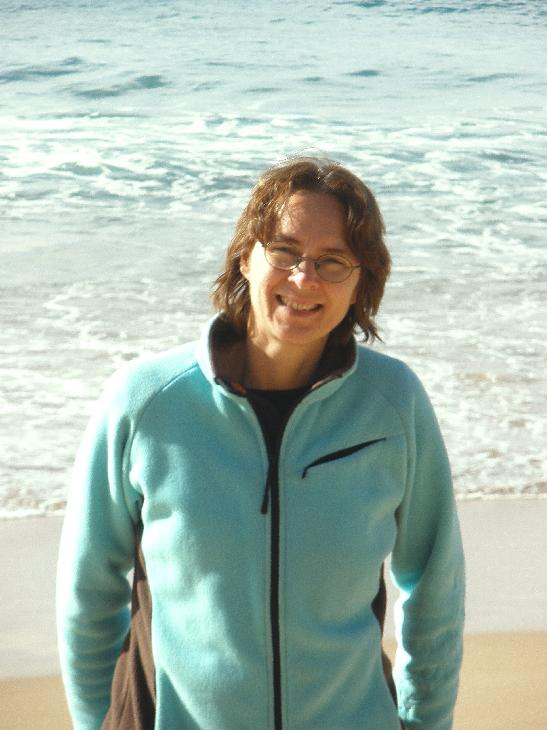
- Born: 1964 (age 61–62); Wuppertal, Germany
- Education: University of Bonn
- Awards: Otto Hahn Medal (1993); Newton Turner Award (2011)
- Scientific career
- Fields: Astrophysics, physics
- Workplaces: CSIRO Astronomy & Space Science, Australia Telescope National Facility

Dr. Bärbel Silvia Koribalski is a research scientist working on galaxy formation at CSIRO's Australia Telescope National Facility (ATNF), part of CSIRO's Astronomy & Space Science (CASS). She obtained her PhD at the University of Bonn in Germany and has studied nearby galaxies. In 2011 she received CSIRO's Newton Turner Award. She is also a project leader of the ASKAP HI All-Sky Survey, known as WALLABY.

== Research ==
Galaxy formation and evolution. Gas kinematics of galaxies using the HI 21-cm spectral line of neutral hydrogen. Radio observations with the Australia Telescope Compact Array (ATCA), also known as the Paul Wild Observatory in Narrabri, named after John Paul Wild, Chief of CSIRO's Division of Radiophysics and later Chairman of CSIRO (1978-1985). Study of galaxy groups, e.g. Dorado Group with V.A. Kilborn et al.

Existing and planned major HI surveys of galaxies:

- "HI Parkes All Sky Survey" (HIPASS)
- "Local Volume HI Survey" (LVHIS), conducted with the Australia Telescope Compact Array (ATCA) in Narrabri - Principal Investigator
- "ASKAP HI All-Sky Survey" (known as WALLABY) - Principal Investigator
- HI surveys with the Square Kilometre Array (SKA)

She is also known for her 2001 discovery of the Peekaboo Galaxy.

== Personal background ==
Born in Wuppertal, Germany, and grown up in Köln on the Rhine, studied physics at the Rheinische Friedrich-Wilhelms Universitaet Bonn.
Hobbies: Athletics

== Career ==
Physics diploma (1990) and PhD (Otto Hahn Medal, 1993) - University of Bonn, Germany

- Newton Turner Award 2011
- CSIRO - OCE Science Leader, from 2012

== Professional associations ==
- International Astronomical Union (IAU)
- Australian Society of Astronomy (ASA)

== Publications ==
- Dr. Bärbel Koribalski's publications - source SAO/NASA Astrophysics Data System (ADS)

== See also ==
- Peekaboo Galaxy
