= NGC 3511 =

Galaxy in the constellation Crater

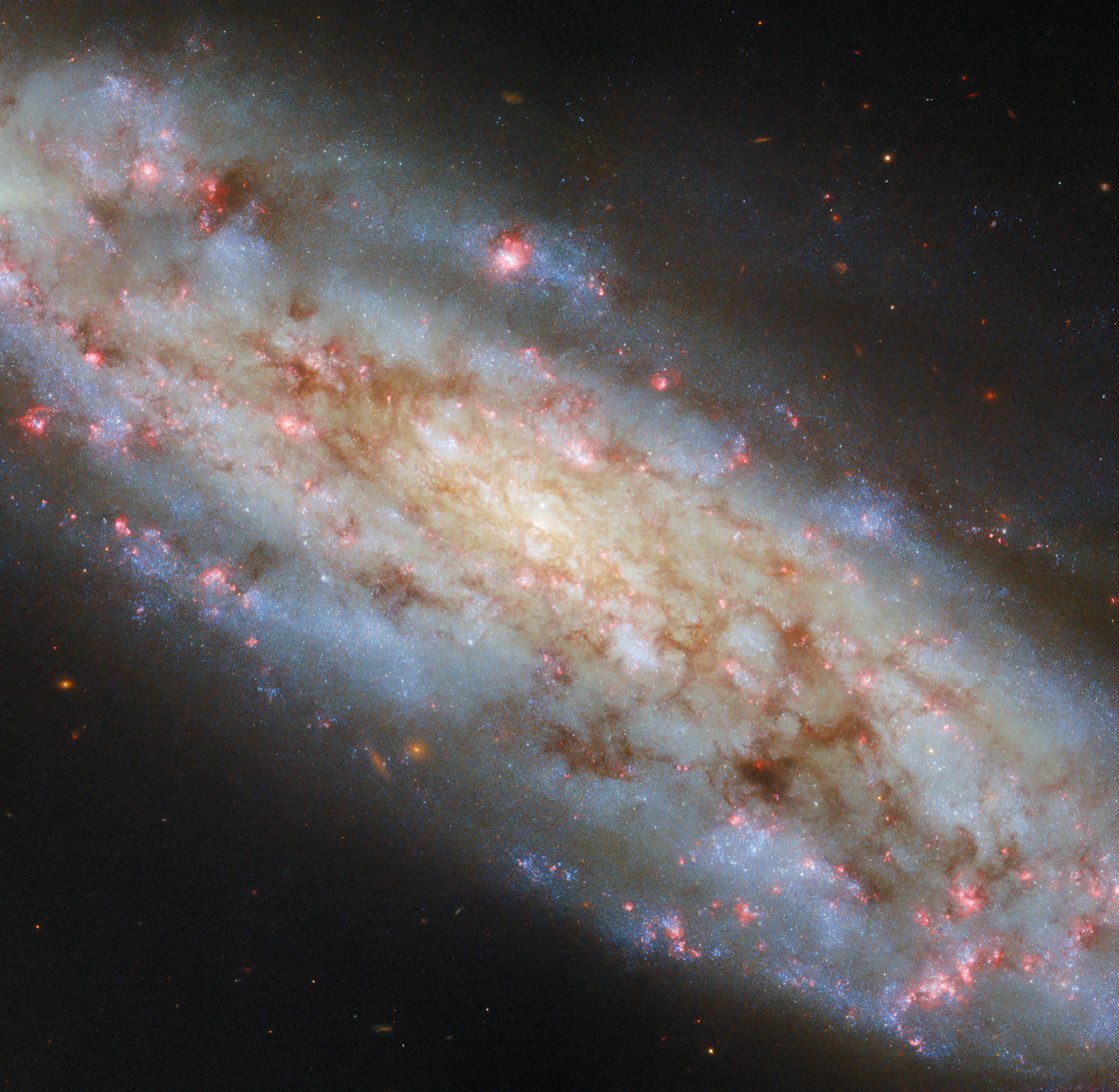
- NGC 3511 imaged by the Hubble Space Telescope

Observation data (J2000 epoch)
- Constellation: Crater
- Right ascension: 11^{h} 03^{m} 23.8090^{s}
- Declination: −23° 05′ 11.555″
- Redshift: 0.003699 ± 0.000010
- Heliocentric radial velocity: 1,109 ± 3 km/s
- Distance: 40.98 ± 1.11 Mly (12.563 ± 0.339 Mpc)
- Apparent magnitude (V): 10.8

Characteristics
- Type: SAB(s)c
- Size: ~107,300 ly (32.89 kpc) (estimated)
- Apparent size (V): 5.8′ × 2.0′
- Notable features: Extended HIPASS source

Other designations
- ESO 502- G 013, AM 1100-224, IRAS 11009-2248, UGCA 223, MCG -04-26-020, PGC 33385

NGC 3511 is an intermediate spiral galaxy located in the constellation Crater. It is located at a distance of about 41 million light-years from Earth, which, given its apparent dimensions, means that NGC 3511 is about 107,000 light-years across. It was discovered by William Herschel on December 21, 1786. It lies two degrees west of Beta Crateris.

NGC 3511 features two very diffuse, thick, and patchy spiral arms that emanate from the bulge, while there are also other spiral arm fragments. Dark dust lanes can be seen across the spiral pattern. The bulge appears elliptical and is weak. The galaxy is seen at a high inclination, estimated to be 70°. In the centre of the galaxy lies a supermassive black hole, whose mass is estimated to be 10^{6.46 ± 0.33} (1.3–6.2 million) M_{☉}, based on the pitch angle of the spiral arms. The galaxy had been classified as a type I Seyfert galaxy; however, it features only narrow emission lines, and has been reclassified as a HII region galaxy. The Infrared Spectrograph (IRS) on the Spitzer Space Telescope has detected polycyclic aromatic hydrocarbon (PAH) emission.

NGC 3511 forms a pair with NGC 3513, which lies 10.5 arcminutes away from NGC 3511. The two galaxies form a small group, known as the NGC 3511 group, which also includes the galaxy ESO 502-024.

== See also ==
- NGC 4088 and NGC 2427 – two similar spiral galaxies
- List of NGC objects (3001–4000)

== Gallery ==
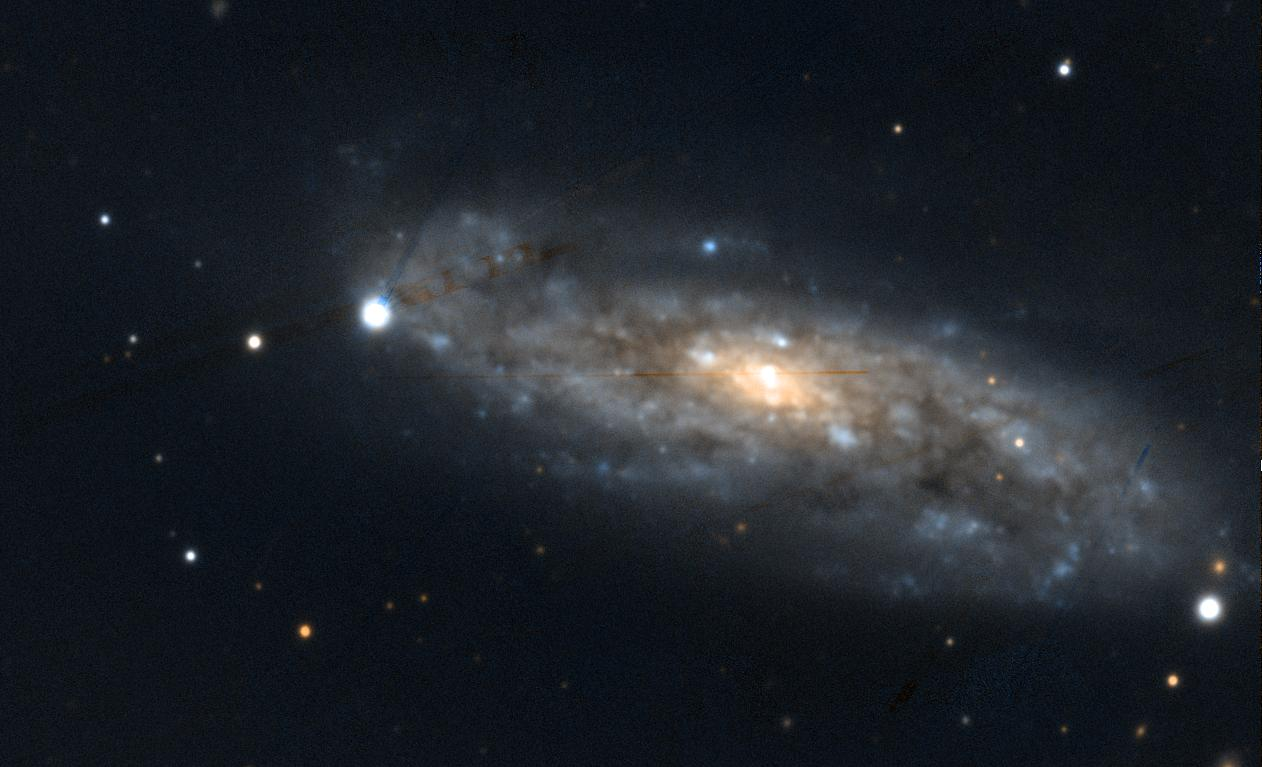
NGC 3511 imaged by PanSTARRS

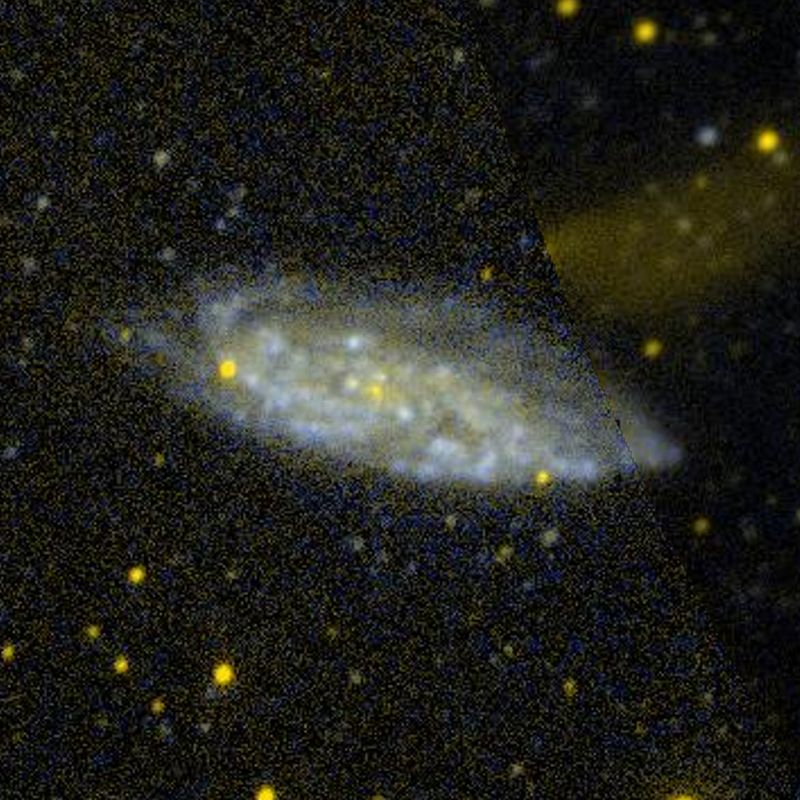
NGC 3511 by GALEX

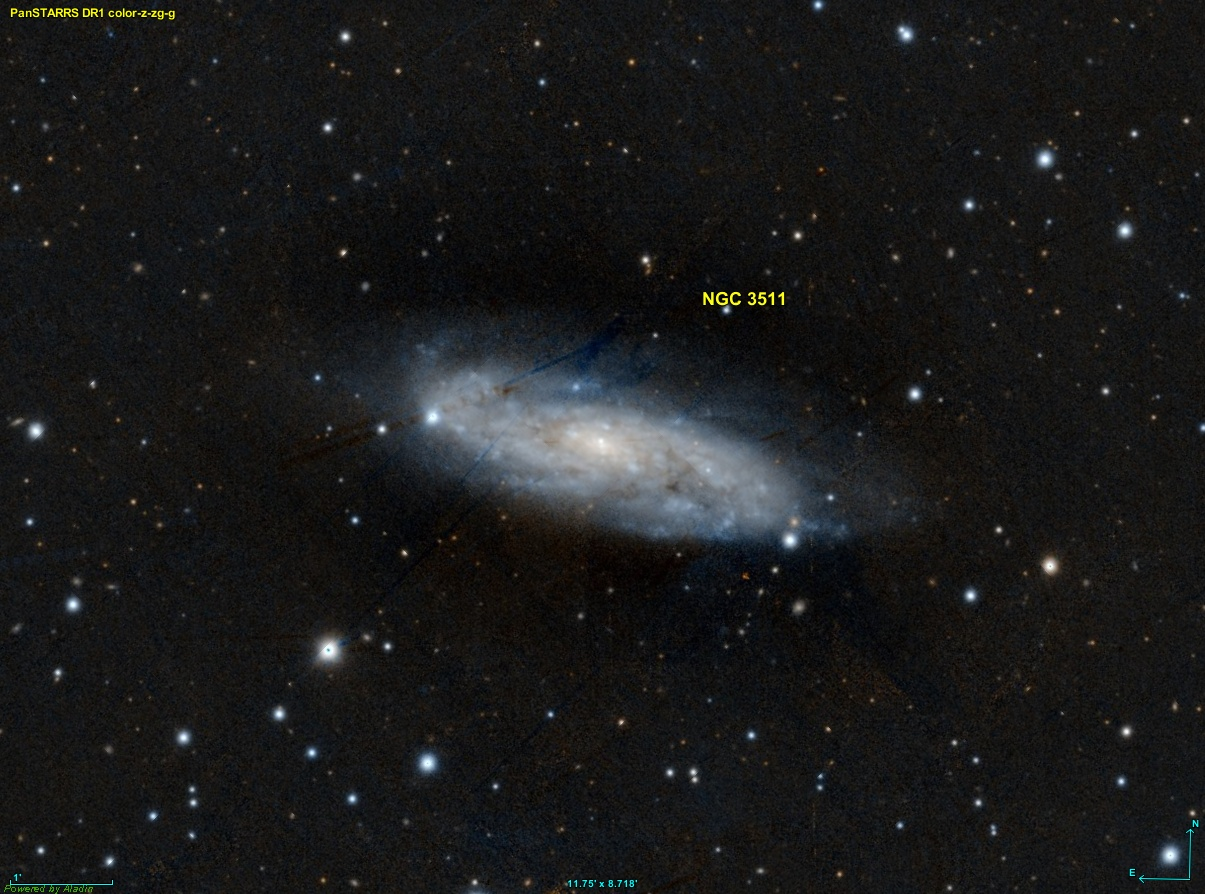
Pan-STARRS image of NGC 3511

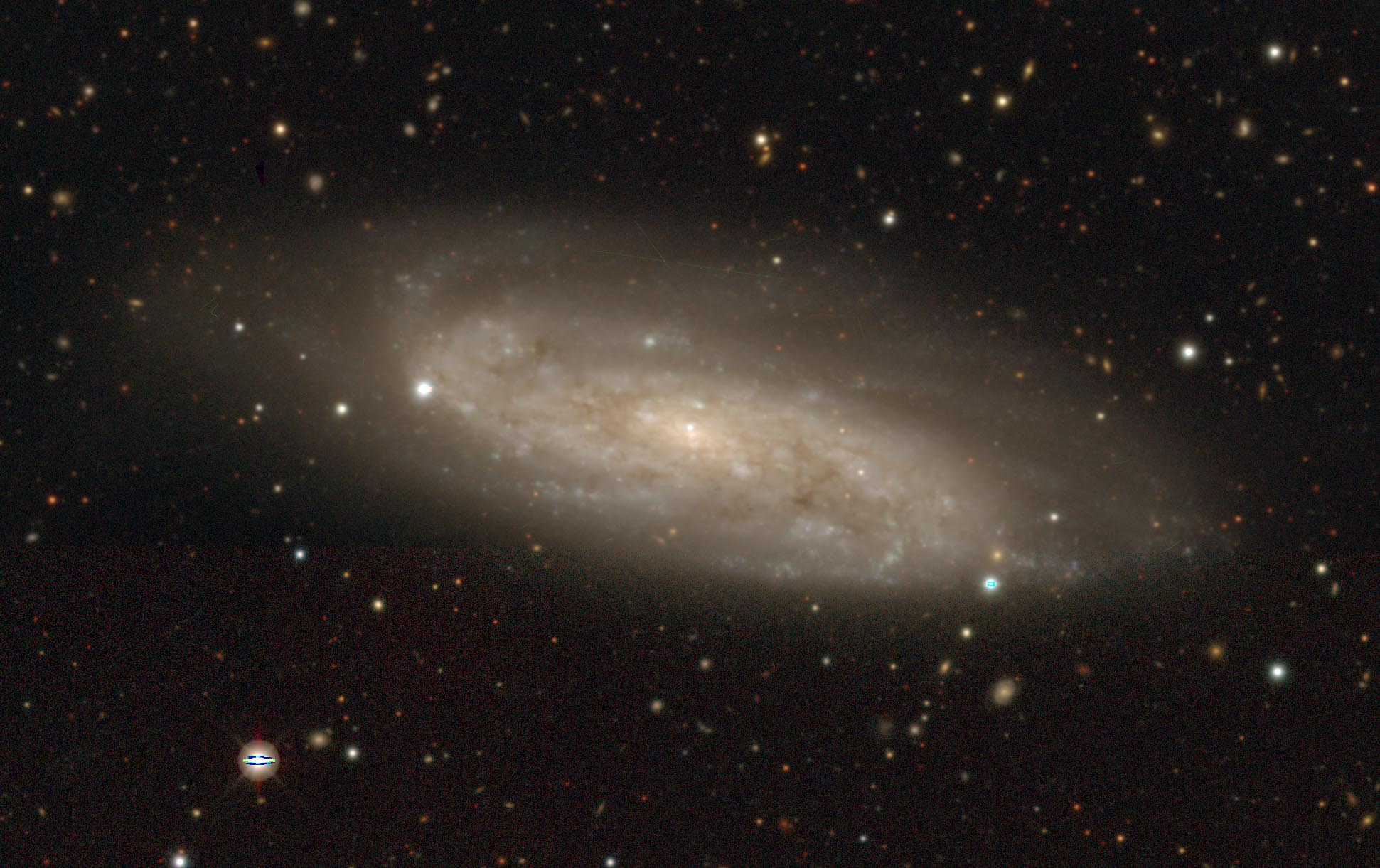
Legacy surveys image of NGC 3511
