= NGC 36 =

Galaxy in the constellation Pisces

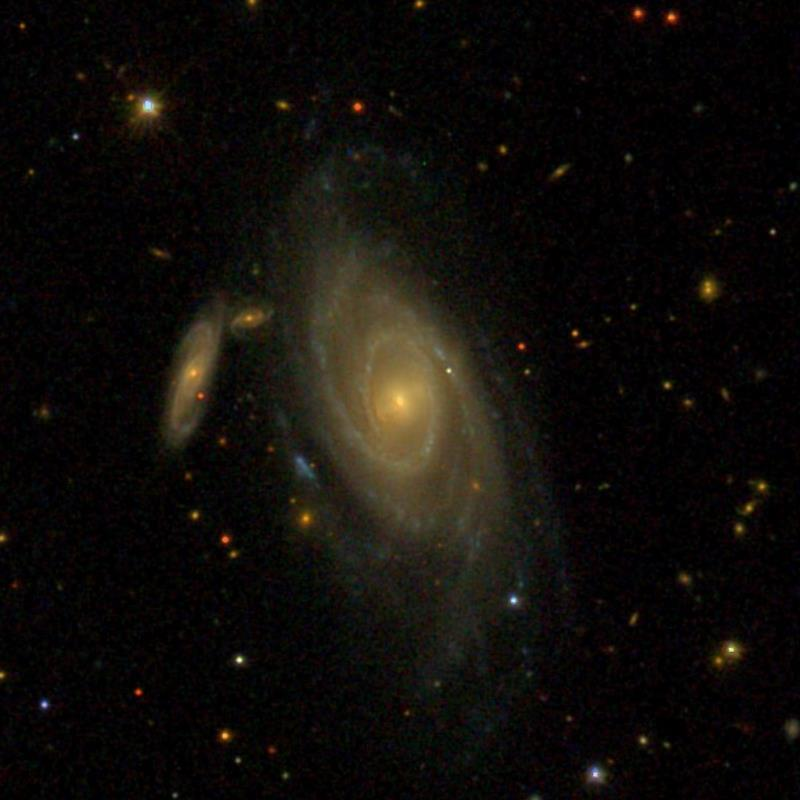
- SDSS image of NGC 36

Observation data (J2000 epoch)
- Constellation: Pisces
- Right ascension: 00^{h} 11^{m} 22.3^{s}
- Declination: +06° 23′ 22″
- Redshift: 0.020114
- Heliocentric radial velocity: 6030 ± 4 km/s
- Distance: 221 Mly (67.7 Mpc)
- Apparent magnitude (V): 14.0

Characteristics
- Type: SBb
- Apparent size (V): 2.2′ × 1.3′

Other designations
- NGC 36, UGC 106, PGC 798, IRAS 00088+0606, IRAS F00088+0606, CGCG 408-040, CGCG 0008.8+0606, HIPASS J0011+06, MCG +01-01-043, UZC J001122.3+062321, 2MASX J00112231+0623212, [HDL96] 408-066, GC 19

NGC 36 is a barred spiral galaxy in the constellation Pisces. It is located about 221 million light-years (68 megaparsecs) away. It was discovered in October 25, 1785, by the astronomer William Herschel.

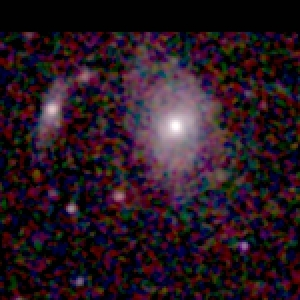
NGC 36 (2MASS)

== See also ==
- NGC
- List of NGC objects (1–1000)
- List of NGC objects
- Galaxy
