= Mopra Telescope =

Radio telescope in NSW, Australia

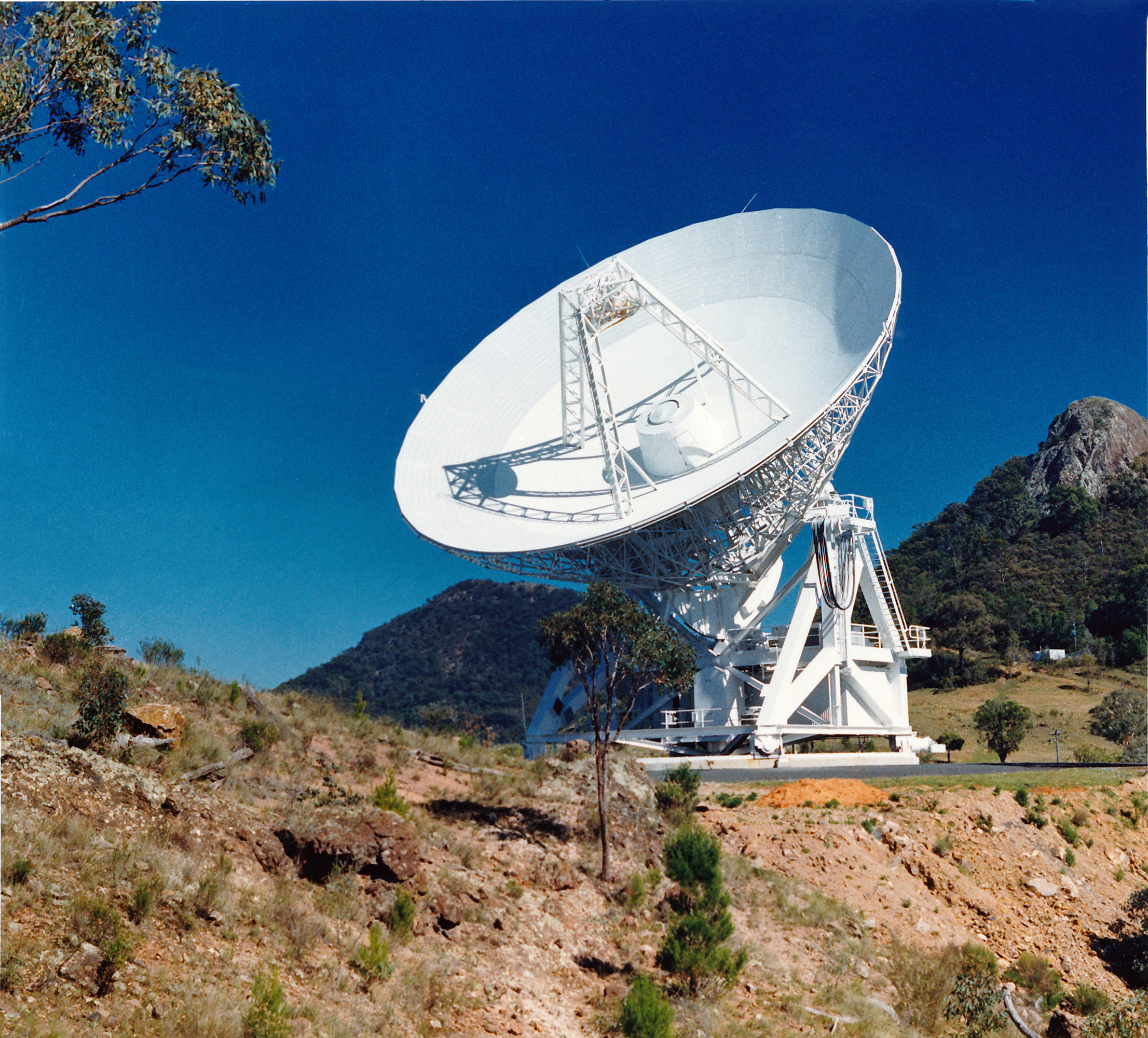
- Mopra in 2011
- Location: New South Wales, AUS
- Coordinates: 31°16′04″S 149°06′00″E
- Diameter: 22 m (72 ft 2 in)
- Website: www.narrabri.atnf.csiro.au/mopra
- Location within Australia
- Related media on Commons

The 22-metre Mopra Radio Telescope, located near Coonabarabran, New South Wales, is part of the Australia Telescope National Facility, operated by CSIRO. The name hails from the location of the facility close to Mopra Rock a geological formation overlooking the telescope. It is also close to the Siding Spring optical observatory in the Warrumbungle National Park.

For use as a single-dish, it has niche equipment allowing large bandwidths to be observed at millimeter-wavelengths. Being a part of the Australia Telescope, it is often used in conjunction with other AT antennas (e.g., the Australia Telescope Compact Array at Narrabri, and the 64-metre Parkes dish) to form a Very Long Baseline Interferometry (VLBI) array.

Commissioned in 2006 was the Mopra Spectrometer (MOPS) "backend" which has a maximum instantaneous bandwidth of 8 GHz, it also has special zoom-modes which allow high resolution studies of up to 16 138 MHz bands over any 8 GHz. It is especially tuned to the high-performance millimeter-wavelength receivers. The main specialty of the instrument is the response of the 3-mm receiver which nominally can observe between 75–115 GHz. New downconversion equipment fine-tuned the 3-mm system while it also received a 12-mm receiver package early-2006.

Until 2006, the telescope was operated on-site by visiting users. The default mode shifted to remote operation from the ATCA, Narrabri in the winter of 2006. On January 13, 2013, the telescope was threatened by the Coonabarabran bushfire but survived with only the on-site building suffering significant damage.

On the 27 May 2014, The Age newspaper reported that the telescope would be closed by CSIRO as a result of the 2014 Federal Budget.

On 16 September 2015, A group of scientists successfully used crowdfunding to raise $65,000 to temporarily delay the telescope's closure.

== See also ==
- List of radio telescopes
