= I Zwicky 18 =

Galaxy in the constellation Ursa Major

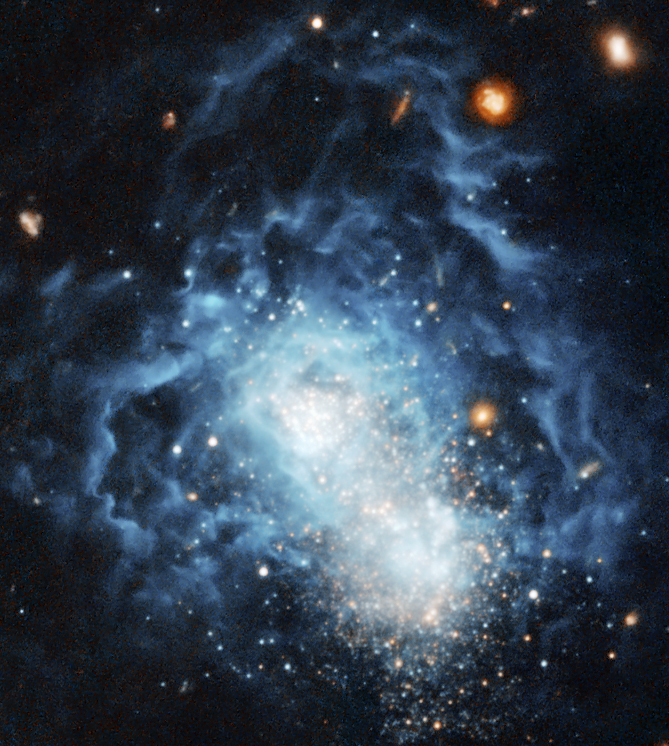
- Hubble Space Telescope (HST) image of I Zwicky 18; Credit: HST/NASA/ESA

Observation data (J2000 epoch)
- Constellation: Ursa Major
- Right ascension: 09^{h} 34^{m} 02.0^{s}
- Declination: +55° 14′ 28″
- Redshift: 0.002585
- Heliocentric radial velocity: 774 km/s
- Distance: 60.137 ± 13.604 Mly (18.438 ± 4.171 Mpc)
- Apparent magnitude (V): 15.98

Characteristics
- Type: cI;Blue Compact Gal, WR, and AGN
- Size: 5,150 ly × 3,650 ly (1.58 kpc × 1.12 kpc) (diameter; 25.0 B-mag arcsec^{−2})
- Apparent size (V): 2.0′ × 2.0′

Other designations
- I ZW 018, 2MASS J09340202+5514272, UGCA 166, LEDA 27182, Mrk 116, PGC 27182, SDSS J093401.92+551427.9

I Zwicky 18 is a blue compact dwarf and Wolf–Rayet galaxy located about 18.44 megaparsecs (60.14 million light-years) away in the constellation Ursa Major. The galaxy was first identified by Swiss astronomer Fritz Zwicky in a 1930s photographic survey of galaxies. It also possesses an active galactic nucleus.

== Age ==
Studies at the Palomar Observatory some 40 years ago led astronomers to believe that the galaxy erupted with star formation billions of years after its galactic neighbours. Galaxies resembling I Zwicky 18's youthful appearance are typically found only in the early universe. Early observations with the Hubble Space Telescope suggested an age of 500 million years old for I Zwicky 18.

Astronomers have hypothesised the existence of young dwarf galaxies in a cold dark matter-dominated Universe. Dwarfs as young as 500 million years would be, however, much fainter than I Zwicky 18. I Zwicky 18 is thus unlikely to have formed all its stars recently in a cold dark matter Universe.

Later observations with the Hubble Space Telescope found faint and old stars contained within the galaxy, suggesting its star formation started at least one billion years ago and possibly as much as ten billion years ago. The galaxy, therefore, may have formed at the same time as most other galaxies.

== Contents ==
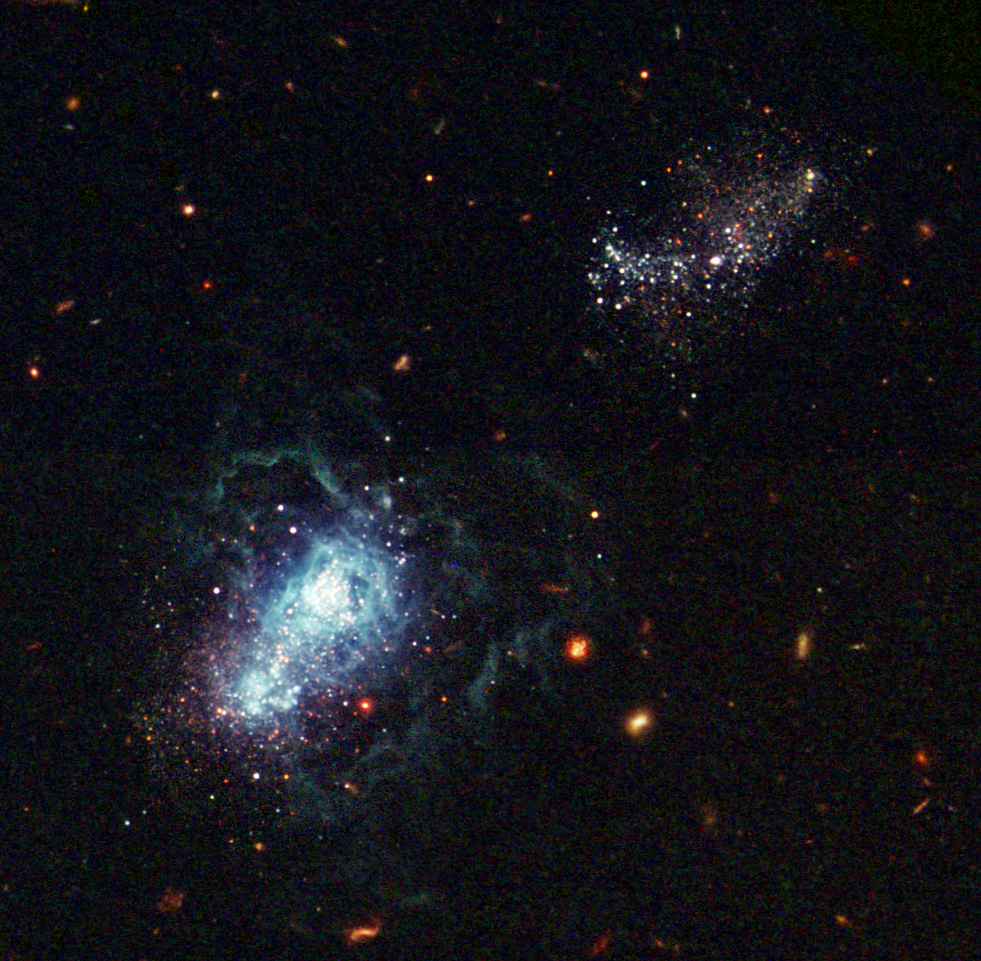
I Zwicky 18 and its component or companion I Zwicky 18 C

Spectroscopic observations with ground-based telescopes have shown that I Zwicky 18 is almost exclusively composed of hydrogen and helium, the main ingredients created in the Big Bang. The galaxy's primordial makeup suggests that its rate of star formation has been much lower than that of other galaxies of similar age. The galaxy has been studied with most of NASA's telescopes, including the Spitzer Space Telescope, the Chandra X-ray Observatory, the Far Ultraviolet Spectroscopic Explorer (FUSE), and the James Webb Space Telescope. However, it remains a mystery why I Zwicky 18 formed so few stars in the past, and why it is forming so many new stars right now.

In 2015 a study found a very large region of ionised helium in this small galaxy, which tends to be more frequent in very distant galaxies with low presence of metals. The ionization of helium implies the presence of objects emitting a radiation intense enough to knock electrons off the helium atoms. Scientists therefore hypothesise that I Zwicky 18 must contain Population III stars, which are almost absent in all other galaxies in the local universe.

== Distance ==
Astronomers at the Space Telescope Science Institute in Baltimore, Maryland and the European Space Agency discerned the distance by observing Cepheid variable stars within I Zwicky 18. These massive flashing stars pulse in a regular rhythm. The timing of their pulsations is directly related to their brightness. The team determined the observed brightness of three Cepheids and compared it with the actual brightness predicted by theoretical models. These models were calculated specifically for I Zwicky 18's deficiency in heavy elements, indicating the galaxy's stars formed before these elements were abundant in the universe. The Cepheid distance was also validated through the observed brightness of the brightest red stars older than one billion years.

The Hubble data suggest that I Zwicky 18 is 59 million light-years from Earth. The galaxy's larger-than-expected distance may explain why astronomers have had difficulty detecting older, fainter stars within the galaxy. The faint, old stars in I Zwicky 18 are almost at the limit of Hubble's resolution and sensitivity.

== Classification ==
I Zwicky 18 is classified as a dwarf irregular galaxy and also a blue compact galaxy and a starburst galaxy. I Zwicky 18 is much smaller than our Milky Way and a mere 1.58 kiloparsecs (5,150 light-years) across. I Zwicky 18 may still be creating Population III stars—spectroscopy shows that its stars are composed almost entirely of hydrogen and helium, with heavier elements almost completely absent. The concentrated bluish-white knots embedded in the heart of the galaxy are two major starburst regions where stars are forming at a furious rate. The wispy blue filaments surrounding the central starburst regions are bubbles of gas that have been blown away by stellar winds and supernova explosions from a previous generation of hot, young stars. This gas is now heated by intense ultraviolet radiation unleashed by a new generation of hot, young stars.

== See also ==
- Peekaboo Galaxy
