= NGC 3513 =

Galaxy in the constellation Crater

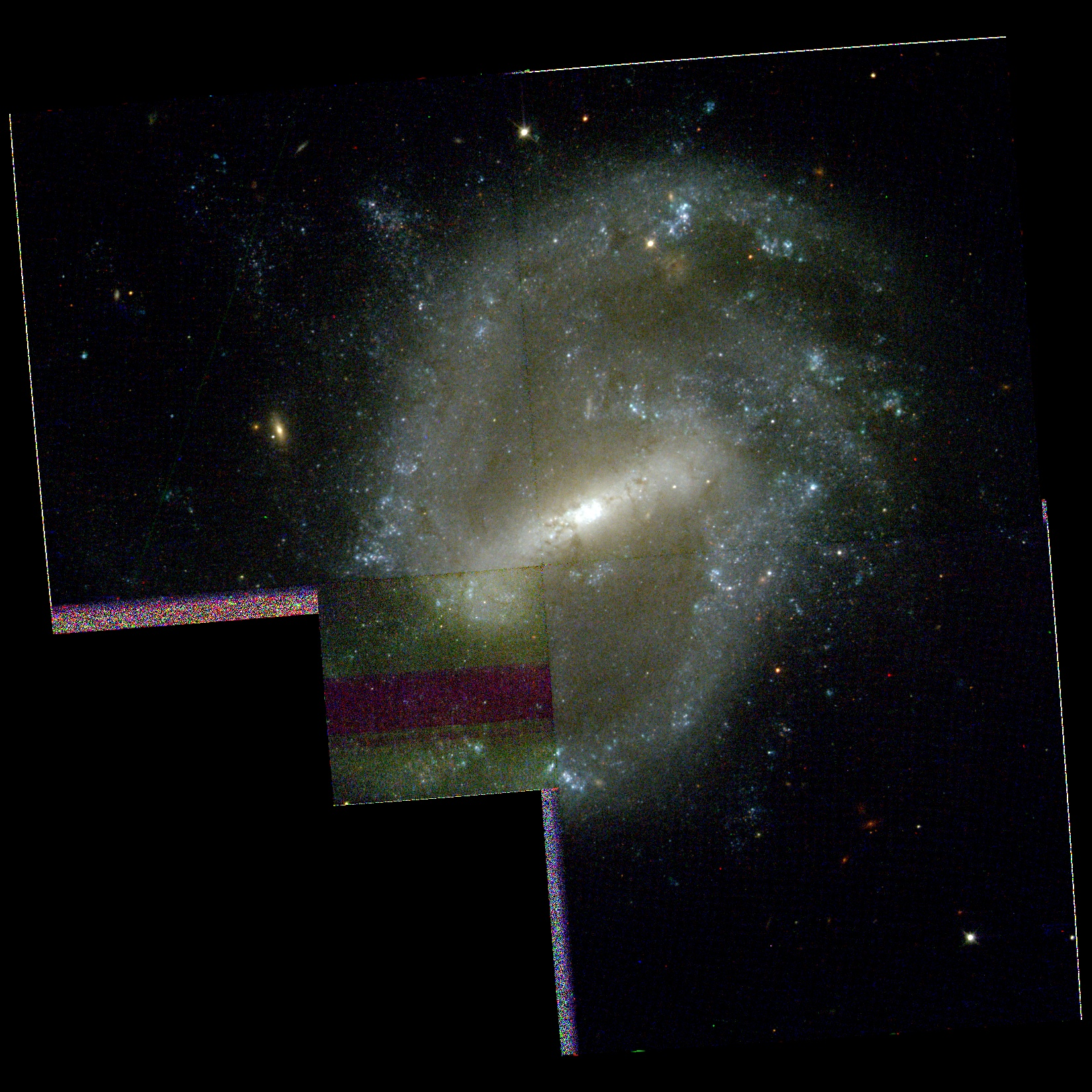
- NGC 3513 imaged by Hubble Space Telescope

Observation data (J2000 epoch)
- Constellation: Crater
- Right ascension: 11^{h} 03^{m} 46.1628^{s}
- Declination: −23° 14′ 44.196″
- Redshift: 0.003979 ± 0.000020
- Heliocentric radial velocity: 1,163 ± 6 km/s
- Galactocentric velocity: 1003 ± 10km/s
- Distance: 40.2 ± 13.0 Mly (12.3 ± 4.0 Mpc)
- Group or cluster: NGC 3511 Group
- Apparent magnitude (V): 11.1

Characteristics
- Type: SB(s)c
- Size: ~47,000 ly (14.3 kpc) (estimated)
- Apparent size (V): 2.8′ × 2.2′

Other designations
- ESO 502- G 014, AM 1101-225, IRAS 11013-2258, UGCA 224, MCG -04-26-021, PGC 33410

NGC 3513 is a barred spiral galaxy in the constellation Crater. The galaxy lies about 40 million light years away from Earth, which means, given its apparent dimensions, that NGC 3513 is approximately 45,000 light years across. It was discovered by William Herschel on December 21, 1786.

NGC 3513 is a barred galaxy with a thin high-surface-brightness bar. At the end of the bar there are slightly offset ansae from which emerge two well defined spiral arms. The arms are patchy, featuring many star formation knots and HII regions. The southern arm is more open, while the northern features more vigorous star formation. The arms can be followed by a bit over half a revolution. The total star formation rate of the galaxy is estimated to be 0.2 M_{☉} per year. The brightest stars of the galaxy can be resolved and have an apparent magnitude of 21.5. Ionised outflows have been observed near the nucleus. The galaxy is seen at an inclination of 39°.

NGC 3513 forms a pair with NGC 3511, which lies 10.5 arcminutes away. There is a faint narrow hydrogen bridge apparently connecting the two galaxies. The two galaxies form a small group, known as the NGC 3511 group, which also includes the galaxy ESO 502-024.

== See also ==
- List of NGC objects (3001-4000)
- List of NGC objects
