= Peekaboo Galaxy =

Dwarf galaxy in the constellation Hydra

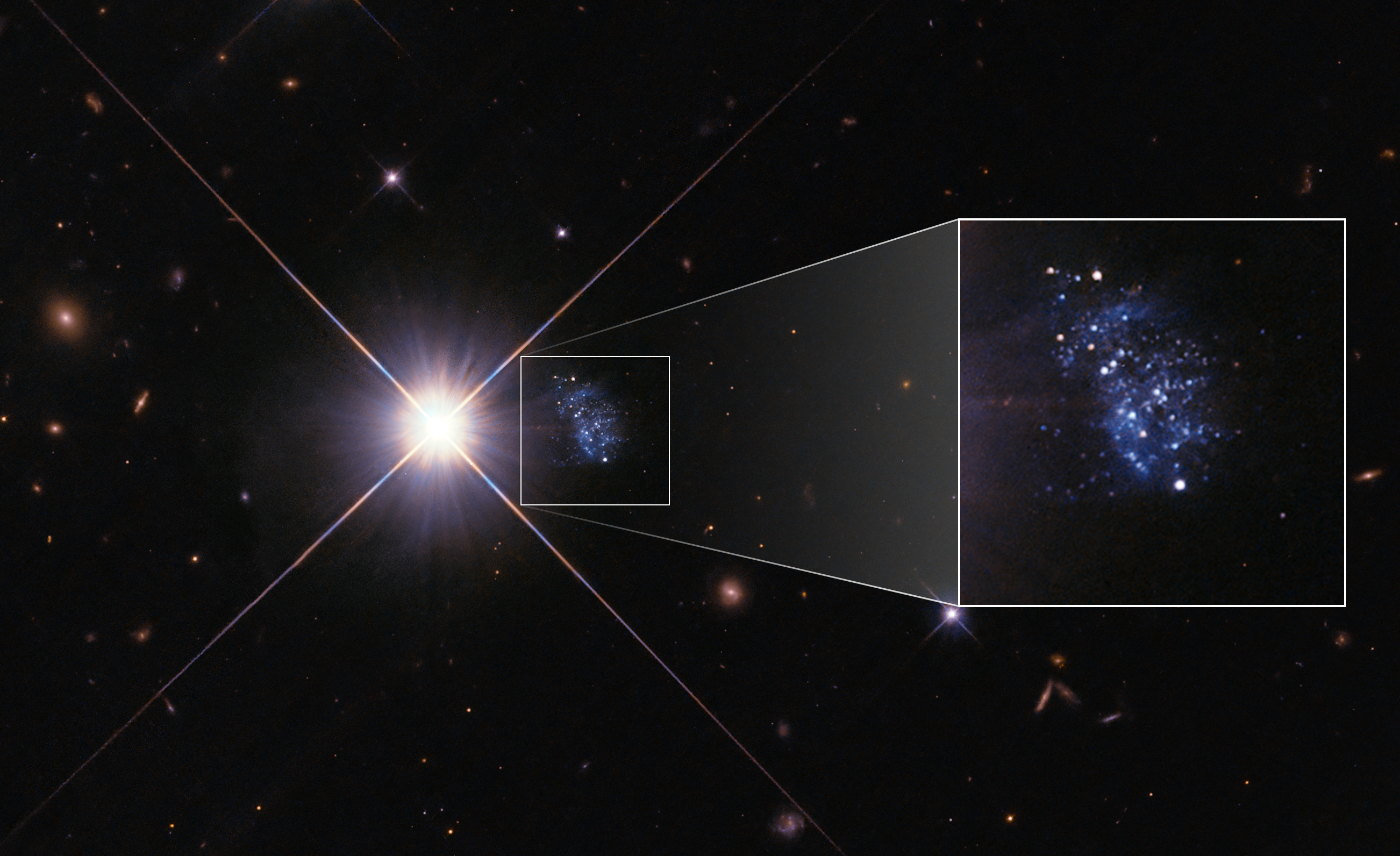

Observation data (J2000 epoch)
- Constellation: Hydra
- Right ascension: 11^{h} 31^{m} 34.6^{s} 11^{h} 31^{m} 35.2^{s}
- Declination: −31° 40′ 28″ −31° 40′ 20″
- Distance: 22.2 ± 2.3 Mly (6.8 ± 0.7 Mpc)

Characteristics
- Type: Irregular compact blue dwarf galaxy
- Apparent size (V): 11 arcsec 1,200 ly (370 pc)

Other designations
- HIPASS J1131-31; PGC 5060432

The Peekaboo Galaxy (officially known as HIPASS J1131-31 and PGC 5060432) is an irregular blue compact dwarf galaxy in the constellation Hydra. The galaxy is relatively small, at about 1,200 light-years (0.00037 Mpc) across. It is also relatively nearby, at a distance of around 22 million light-years (6.7 Mpc) from Earth. The Peekaboo Galaxy is considered one of the most metal-poor ("extremely metal-poor" (XMP)), least chemically enriched, and seemingly primordial, galaxies known; it is the most metal-poor galaxy in the Local Volume.

== Discovery ==
=== History of observation ===
The Peekaboo Galaxy was hidden behind a relatively fast-moving foreground star, named TYC 7215-199-1, but during the second half of the 20th century, the star moved aside, clearing the view to the obscured galaxy, which gave the galaxy its name.

Detailed studies of the galaxy were reported in November 2022, and were based on work using the Hubble Space Telescope. The astronomers were able to closely examine about 60 of the individual stars in the galaxy, all appearing relatively young, a few billion years old or younger. In the words of Bärbel Koribalski, astronomer at CSIRO in Australia, original discoverer of the galaxy in 2001, and coauthor of the 2022 study of the galaxy, "with combined data from the Hubble Space Telescope, the Southern African Large Telescope (SALT), and others, we know that the Peekaboo Galaxy is one of the most metal-poor galaxies ever detected."

According to current thinking, early in the formation of the universe, 13.8 billion years ago, the earliest first stars were made, and were mostly composed of hydrogen and helium. Later, these very early stars fused their hydrogen and helium into heavier elements, up to, and including, iron. Heavier elements, beyond iron, were later produced as a result of violent supernova explosions, scattering these newly formed heavier elements throughout the Universe, where they would be incorporated into the formation of newer stars.

== Future studies ==
Karachentsev et al. write that the age of the Peekaboo Galaxy is "decidedly ambiguous".

Future further studies of the galaxy with the Hubble Space Telescope and the James Webb Space Telescope are being considered.

== See also ==
- Galaxy formation and evolution
- I Zwicky 18
- List of galaxies
- Metallicity distribution function
- Metallicity § Galaxies
- Stellar classification
- Stellar evolution
- Stellar population
