= NGC 2427 =

Galaxy in the constellation Puppis

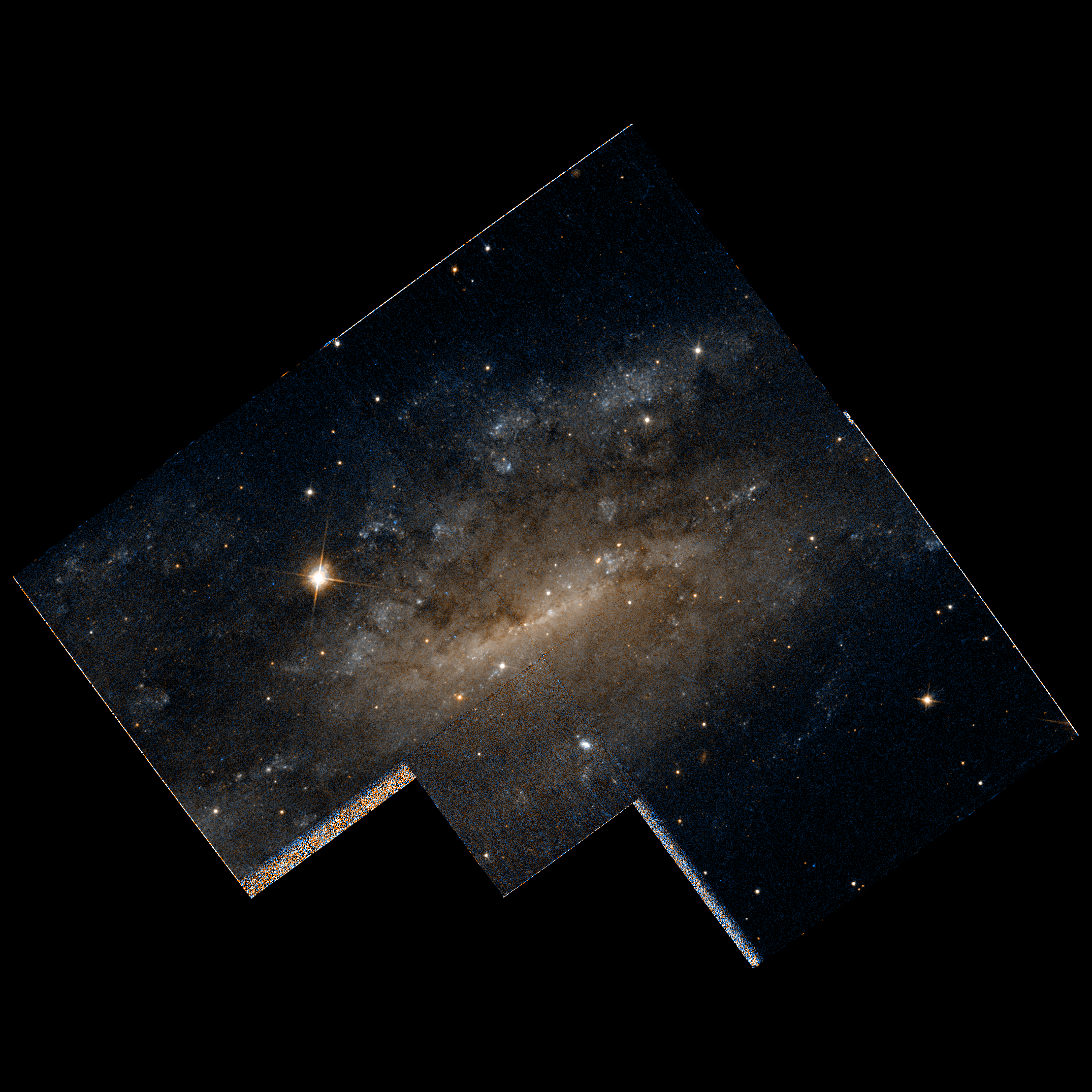
- NGC 2427 imaged by the Hubble Space Telescope

Observation data (J2000 epoch)
- Constellation: Puppis
- Right ascension: 07^{h} 36^{m} 28.035^{s}
- Declination: −47° 38′ 11.05″
- Redshift: 0.003242 ± 0.000010
- Heliocentric radial velocity: 972 ± 3 km/s
- Distance: 35.3 ± 4.8 Mly (10.8 ± 1.5 Mpc)
- Apparent magnitude (V): 11.6

Characteristics
- Type: SAB(s)c pec
- Size: ~53,000 ly (16.3 kpc) (estimated)
- Apparent size (V): 5.2′ × 2.2′

Other designations
- ESO 208- G 027, IRAS 07350-4731, PGC 21375

NGC 2427 is a barred spiral galaxy located in the constellation Puppis. It is located at a distance of about 35 million light years from Earth, which, given its apparent dimensions, means that NGC 2427 is about 50,000 light years across. It was discovered by John Herschel on March 1, 1835.

NGC 2427 has a bright short bar and two main spiral arms. The arms are asymmetric and of low surface brightness and feature many knots and HII regions the largest of which are about one arcsecond across. The total star formation rate is estimated to be 1.1 M_{☉} per year. When observed in H-alpha the bar is well defined and narrow and appears about one arcminute long across the galactic bulge. Many faint HII regions are visible in the inner and extended eastern disk of the galaxy. As the galaxy lies near the galactic plane and is seen in high inclination it is difficult to trace the spiral arms in H-alpha. The nucleus is very small and faint and hosts a nuclear star cluster which is 3.2 arcseconds across.

NGC 2427 is a member of a galaxy group which also includes the galaxies NGC 2502, ESO 208- G 021, and ESO 209- G 009.

== See also ==
- List of NGC objects (2001–3000)
