= HIPASS =

Astronomical survey for neutral atomic hydrogen

- Website: www.atnf.csiro.au/research/multibeam/

The H I Parkes All Sky Survey (HIPASS) is a large survey for neutral atomic hydrogen (H I). Most of the data was taken between 1997 and 2002 using CSIRO's 64 m Parkes Telescope. HIPASS covered 71% of the sky and identified more than 5000 galaxies; the major galaxy catalogs are: the "HIPASS Bright Galaxy Catalog" (HIPASS BGC), the southern HIPASS catalog (HICAT), and the northern HIPASS catalog (NHICAT) Discoveries include over 5000 galaxies (incl. several new galaxies), the Leading Arm of the Magellanic Stream and a few gas clouds devoid of stars.

== Survey ==
HIPASS covers a velocity range of −1,280 to 12,700 km/s. It was the first blind HI survey to cover the entire southern sky and the northern sky up to +25°. Technical overview, calibration and imaging (Barnes et al. 2001).

=== Southern Sky observations ===
Observations of the southern sky started in February 1997, and were completed in March 2000, consisting of 23,020 eight-degree scans of each of 9 minutes duration. HIPASS scanned the entire southern sky five times. The southern HIPASS galaxy catalog (HICAT) contains 4315 HI sources.

=== Northern Sky observations ===
Northern HIPASS extended the survey into the northern sky. The entire Virgo Cluster region was observed in Northern HIPASS. NHICAT, the catalogue of the northern extension of HIPASS contains 1,002 H I sources.

=== CHIPASS ===
Archival data from HIPASS and the HI Zone of Avoidance (HIZOA) survey were reprocessed to make a new 20cm confusion-limited continuum map of the sky south of declination +25°. Its relatively high sensitivity and resolution (compared to other single-dish surveys) and low level of artefacts has made this survey invaluable, particularly for merging with interferometric data such as WALLABY to improve the coverage of extended structure.

== Multibeam Receiver ==
Observations for HIPASS were taken using the Parkes 21-cm Multibeam Receiver. The instrument consists of a focal-plane array of 13 individual receivers arranged in a hexagonal pattern. Built in a collaboration between numerous institutions, it was funded by the Australian Research Council (ARC) and the Australia Telescope National Facility (ATNF) to undertake the HIPASS and ZOA surveys.

== Discoveries ==
=== Leading arm of Magellanic Stream ===
HIPASS discovered the Leading Arm of the Magellanic Stream. This is an extension of the Magellanic Stream beyond the Magellanic clouds. The existence of the Leading Arm is predicted by models of a tidal interaction between the Magellanic Clouds and the Milky Way.

=== HIPASS J0731-69 ===
HIPASS J0731-69 is a cloud of gas devoid of any stars. It is associated with the asymmetric spiral galaxy NGC 2442. It is likely that HIPASS J0731-69 was torn loose from NGC 2442 by a companion.

=== HIPASS J1712-64 ===
HIPASS J1712-64 is an isolated extragalactic cloud of neutral hydrogen with no associated stars. The cloud is a binary system and is not dense enough to form stars. HIPASS J1712-64 was probably ejected during an interaction between the Magellanic clouds and the Milky way.

=== New galaxies in the Centaurus A/M83 Group ===
Ten new galaxies were identified in the Centaurus A/M83 Group, bringing the total (at the time) to 31 galaxies.

== See also ==
- HIJASS, the H I Jodrell All Sky Survey
