= Widefield ASKAP L-Band Legacy All-Sky Blind Survey =

The Widefield ASKAP L-band Legacy All-sky Blind surveY (WALLABY) is a next-generation survey of the 21 cm radio emission from neutral hydrogen (HI) in the Local Universe. It is hosted by the Australian Square Kilometer Array Pathfinder (ASKAP) telescope, WALLABY will survey three-quarters of the sky over a Declination range −90° to +30° to a redshift of 0.26. It will have an angular resolution of 30 arcsec and a sensitivity of 1.6 mJy/beam in each 4 km/s channel. WALLABY is expected to detect about 500,000 galaxies with a mean redshift of 0.05, at a mean distance of about 200 Mpc. The scientific goals of WALLABY include:

- a census of gas-rich galaxies in the vicinity of the Local Group;
- a study of the HI properties of galaxies, groups and clusters, including the influence of the environment on galaxy evolution;

== History ==
The WALLABY project was proposed in 2009 by a team led by B. S. Koribalski and L. Staveley-Smith. It was ranked by ASKAP in the top two of ten Survey Science projects, with Koribalski and Staveley-Smith the principal investigators. Koribalski stepped down in 2019. Currently, Lister Staveley-Smith is the Principal Investigator, Karen Lee-Waddell is the project scientist, and Tobias Westmeier is the project manager.. The WALLABY team now has over 150 members.

=== Early science results ===
Several science results have been published from WALLABY Early Science observations. Highlights include three observations of groups of galaxies, and two detailed studies of nearby galaxies.

== WALLABY pilot survey ==
In preparation for the full WALLABY survey, expected to start in 2021, WALLABY conducted a pilot survey in 2020, consisting of three survey fields in the direction of Hydra, NGC 4636 and Norma. All data have been fully observed, and the Hydra field has been calibrated and imaged, leading to the first internal release of data for almost 150 HI detections in the direction of the Hydra cluster. WALLABY science teams are currently analysing the Hydra data, and first science papers are expected in late 2020.
