= Parkes Observatory =

Radio telescope observatory in New South Wales, Australia

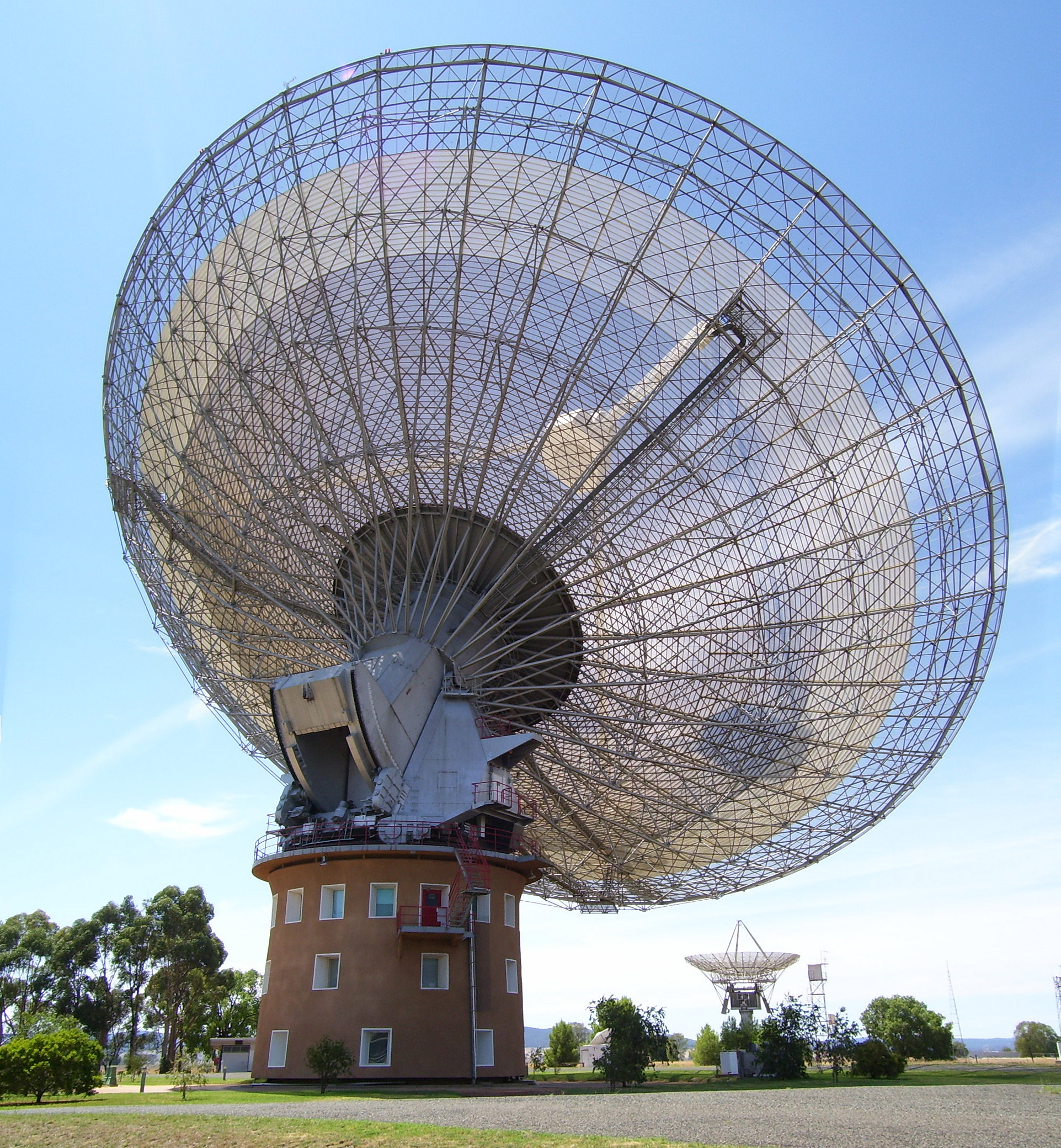
- The Parkes 64m Radio Telescope
- Organization: CSIRO
- Location: Parkes, New South Wales, Australia
- Coordinates: 32°59′52″S 148°15′47″E
- Website: www.parkes.atnf.csiro.au
- Telescopes: Parkes 12-metre telescope; Parkes 18-metre telescope; Parkes Radio Telescope
- Related media on Commons

History
- Built: 1961

Australian National Heritage List
- Official name: Parkes Observatory
- Type: Listed place
- Designated: 10 August 2020
- Reference no.: 106345

Parkes Observatory is a radio astronomy observatory, located 20 kilometres (12 mi) north of the town of Parkes, New South Wales, Australia. It hosts Murriyang, the 64 m CSIRO Parkes Radio Telescope also known as "The Dish", along with two smaller radio telescopes. The 64 m dish was one of several radio antennas used to receive live television images of the Apollo 11 Moon landing. Its scientific contributions over the decades led the ABC to describe it as "the most successful scientific instrument ever built in Australia" after 40 years of operation.

The Parkes Observatory is run by the Commonwealth Scientific and Industrial Research Organisation (CSIRO), as part of the Australia Telescope National Facility (ATNF) network of radio telescopes. It is frequently operated together with other CSIRO radio telescopes, principally the array of six 22-metre (72 ft) dishes at the Australia Telescope Compact Array near Narrabri, and a single 22-metre (72 ft) dish at Mopra (near Coonabarabran), together with other radio telescopes in Australia, and other countries, to form a very long baseline interferometry array.

The observatory was included on the Australian National Heritage List on 10 August 2020.

== Design and construction ==
The Parkes Radio Telescope, completed in 1961, was the brainchild of E. G. "Taffy" Bowen, chief of the CSIRO's Radiophysics Laboratory. During the Second World War, he had worked on radar development in the United States and had made connections in its scientific community. Calling on this old boy network, he persuaded two philanthropic organisations, the Carnegie Corporation and the Rockefeller Foundation, to fund half the cost of the telescope. It was this recognition and key financial support from the United States that persuaded Australian prime minister, Robert Menzies, to agree to fund the rest of the project.

The Parkes site was chosen in 1956, as it was accessible, but far enough from Sydney to have clear skies. Additionally the mayor Ces Moon and landowner Australia James Helm were both enthusiastic about the project.

The success of the Parkes telescope led NASA to copy features of the design into their Deep Space Network, which included three 64-metre (210 ft) dishes built at Goldstone, California, Madrid, Spain, and Tidbinbilla, near Canberra in Australia.

The telescope continues to be upgraded, and as of 2018 is 10,000 times more sensitive than its initial configuration.

== Radio telescope ==
=== Hardware ===
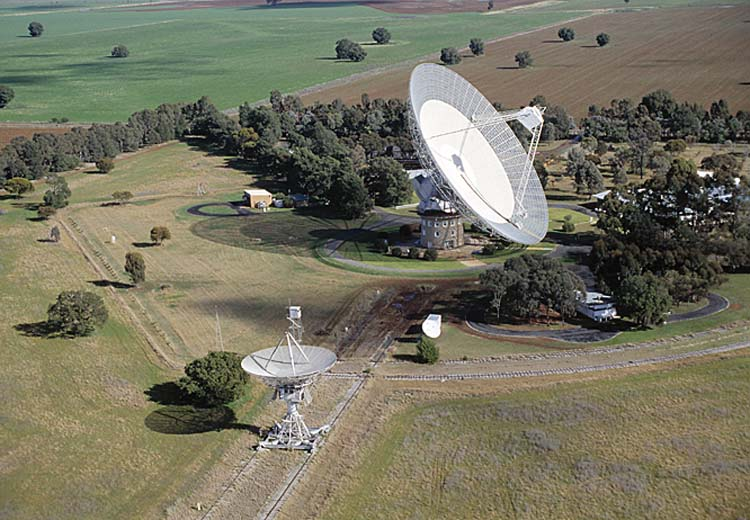
The 64-metre (210 ft) diameter dish with the 18-metre (59 ft) dish in the foreground (mounted on rails and used in interferometry)

The primary observing instrument is the 64-metre (210 ft) movable dish telescope, second largest in the Southern Hemisphere, and one of the first large movable dishes in the world (DSS-43 at Tidbinbilla was extended from 64-metre (210 ft) to 70-metre (230 ft) in 1987, surpassing Parkes).

The inner part of the dish is solid aluminium and the outer area a fine aluminium mesh, creating its distinctive two-tone appearance.

In the early 1970s the outer mesh panels were replaced by perforated aluminium panels. The inner smooth plated surface was upgraded in 1975 which provided focusing capability for centimetre- and millimetre-length microwaves.

The inner aluminium plating was expanded out to a 55 metres (180 ft) diameter in 2003, improving signals by 1dB.

The telescope has an altazimuth mount. It is guided by a small mock-telescope placed within the structure at the same rotational axes as the dish, but with an equatorial mount. The two are dynamically locked when tracking an astronomical object by a laser guiding system. This primary-secondary approach was designed by Barnes Wallis.

=== Receivers ===
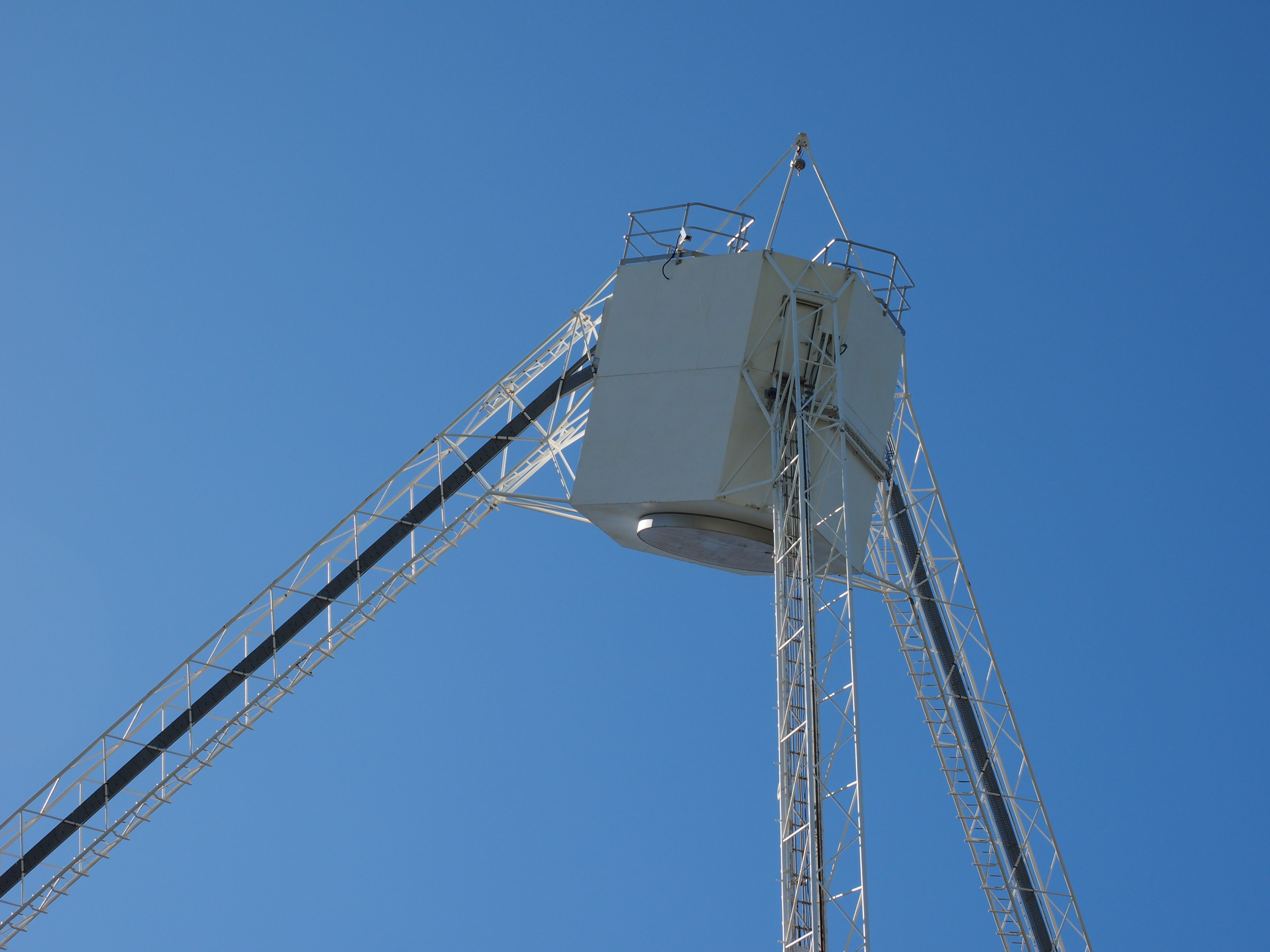
The radio telescope's focus cabin

The focus cabin is located at the focus of the parabolic dish, supported by three struts 27 metres (89 ft) above the dish. The cabin contains multiple radio and microwave detectors, which can be switched into the focus beam for different science observations.

These include:

- 1,050-centimetre (34.4 ft) receiver (Replaced now by UWL)
- The Multibeam Receiver – a 13-horned receiver cooled at −200 °C (−328.0 °F; 73.1 K) for the 21-centimetre (8.3 in) Hydrogen line.
- H-OH receiver (Replaced now by UWL)
- GALILEO receiver (Replaced now by UWL)
- AT multiband receivers, covering 2.2-2.5,4.5-5.1 and 8.1-8.7 GHz
- METH6, covering 5.9-6.8 GHz
- MARS (X band receiver), covering 8.1-8.5 GHz
- KU-BAND, covering 12–15 GHz
- 13MM (K band receiver), covering 16–26 GHz
- Ultra Wideband Low (UWL) receiver – installed in 2018 it can simultaneously receive signals from 700 MHz to 4 GHz. It is cooled to −255 °C (−427.0 °F; 18.1 K) to minimise noise and will enable astronomers to work on more than one project at once.

=== 18m "Kennedy Dish" antenna ===
The 18-metre (59 ft) "Kennedy Dish" antenna was transferred from the Fleurs Observatory (where it was part of the Mills Cross Telescope) in 1963. Mounted on rails and powered by a tractor engine to allow the distance between the antenna and the main dish to be easily varied, it was used as an interferometer with the main dish. Phase instability due to an exposed cable meant that its pointing ability was diminished, but it was able to be used for identifying size and brightness distributions. In 1968 it successfully proved that Radio galaxy lobes were not expanding, and in the same era contributed to Hydrogen line and OH investigations. As a stand-alone antenna it was used in studying the Magellanic Stream.

It was used as an uplink antenna in the Apollo program, as the larger Parkes telescope is receive-only. It is preserved by the Australia Telescope National Facility.

=== Australia Telescope National Facility ===
The observatory is a part of the Australia Telescope National Facility network of radio telescopes. The 64-metre (210 ft) dish is frequently operated together with the Australia Telescope Compact Array at Narrabri, the ASKAP array in Western Australia, and a single dish at Mopra, telescopes operated by the University of Tasmania as well as telescopes from New Zealand, South Africa and Asia to form a Very Long Baseline Interferometry (VLBI) array.

== Astronomy research ==
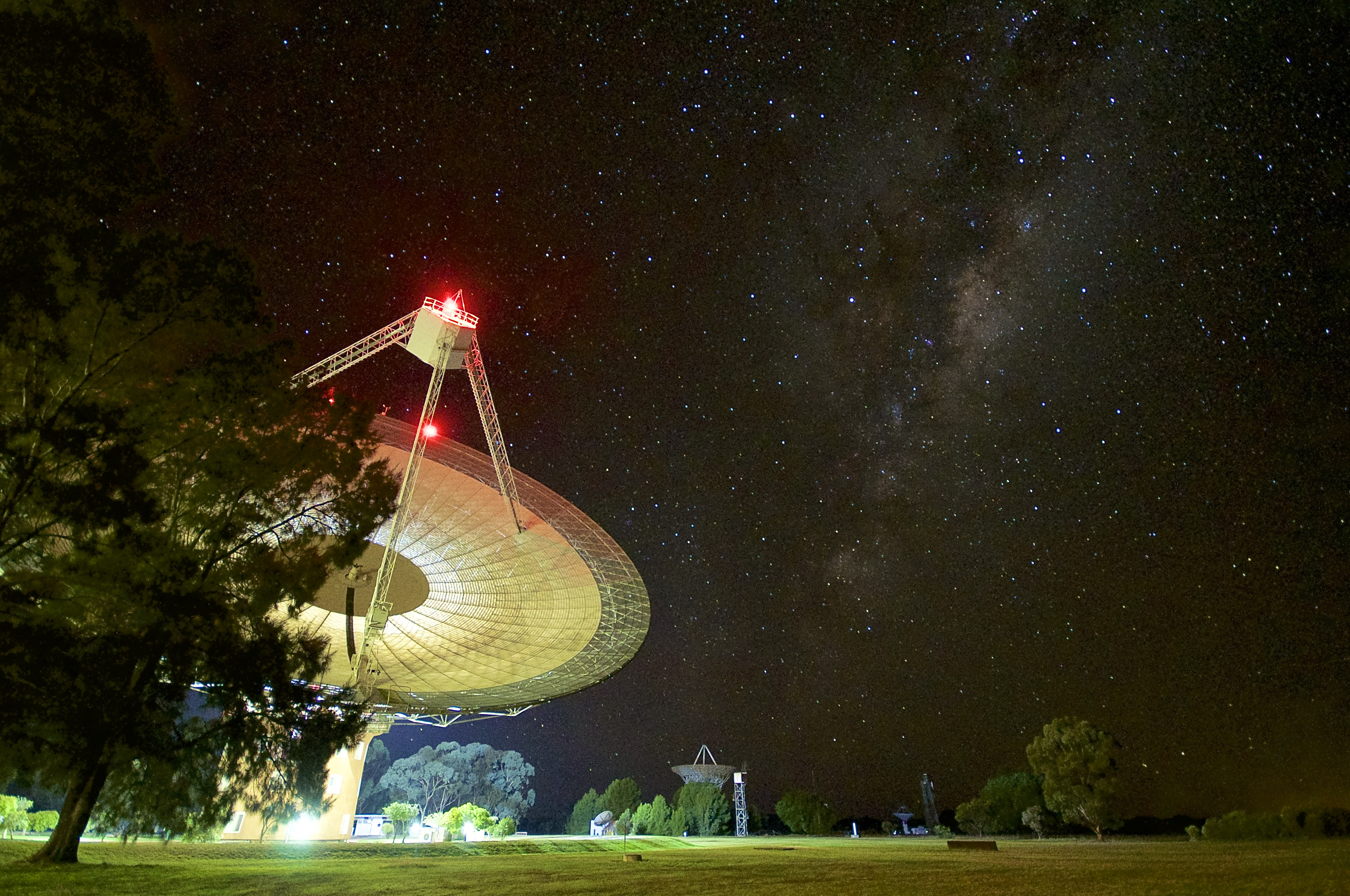
The Parkes observatory is positioned to be isolated from radio frequency interference. The site also sees dark skies in optical light, as seen here in June 2017 with the Milky Way Galaxy overhead.

=== Timeline ===
1960s

- Built in 1961 and was fully operational by 1963.
- A 1962 series of lunar occultations of the radio source 3C 273 observed by the Parkes Telescope were used to locate its exact position, allowing astronomers to find and study its visual component. Soon to be called "quasi-stellar radio sources" (quasar), the Parkes observation was the first time this type of object was associated with an optical counterpart.
- 1964 to 1966, all-sky survey at 408 MHz of the southern sky is conducted and published (first version of the Parkes Catalogue of Radio Sources) finding over 2000 radio sources including many new quasars.
- Second all-sky survey at 2,700 MHz begins in 1968 (completed in 1980).

1990s

- June and November 1990, Parkes collaborates with the Massachusetts Institute of Technology and the National Radio Astronomy Observatory to conduct a 5GHZ (6 cm) all-sky survey (The Parkes-MIT-NRAO (PMN) Surveys). The Telescope is equipped with a NRAO multi-beam receiver operating at a frequency of 4850 MHz.
- Between 1997 and 2002 it conducted the H I Parkes All Sky Survey (HIPASS) neutral hydrogen survey, the largest blind survey for galaxies in the hydrogen line (21-centimeter line or H I line) to date.

2000s

- More than half of currently known pulsars were discovered by the Parkes Observatory.
- Vital component of the Parkes Pulsar Timing Array programme to detect gravity waves as part of the broader International Pulsar Timing Array (IPTA), which also includes the North American Nanohertz Observatory for Gravitational Waves (NANOGrav) and the European Pulsar Timing Array (EPTA).

=== Fast radio burst ===
Fast radio bursts were discovered in 2007 when Duncan Lorimer of West Virginia University assigned his student David Narkevic to look through archival data recorded in 2001 by the Parkes radio dish. Analysis of the survey data found a 30-jansky dispersed burst which occurred on 24 July 2001, less than 5 milliseconds in duration, located 3° from the Small Magellanic Cloud. At the time it was theorised FRBs might be signals from another galaxy, emissions from neutron stars or black holes. More recent results confirm that magnetars, a kind of highly magnetised neutron star, may be one source of fast radio bursts.

=== Peryton discovery ===
In 1998 Parkes telescope began detecting fast radio bursts and similar looking signals named perytons. Perytons were thought to be of terrestrial origin, such as interference from lightning strikes. In 2015 it was determined that perytons were caused by staff members opening the door of the facility's microwave oven during its cycle. When the microwave oven door was opened, 1.4 GHz microwaves from the magnetron shutdown phase were able to escape. Subsequent tests revealed that a peryton can be generated at 1.4 GHz when a microwave oven door is opened prematurely and the telescope is at an appropriate relative angle.

=== Breakthrough Listen ===
The telescope has been contracted to be used in a search for radio signals from extraterrestrial technologies for the heavily funded project Breakthrough Listen. The principal role of the Parkes Telescope in the program will be to conduct a survey of the Milky Way galactic plane over 1.2 to 1.5 GHz and a targeted search of approximately 1000 nearby stars over the frequency range 0.7 to 4 GHz.

== Historical non-astronomy research ==
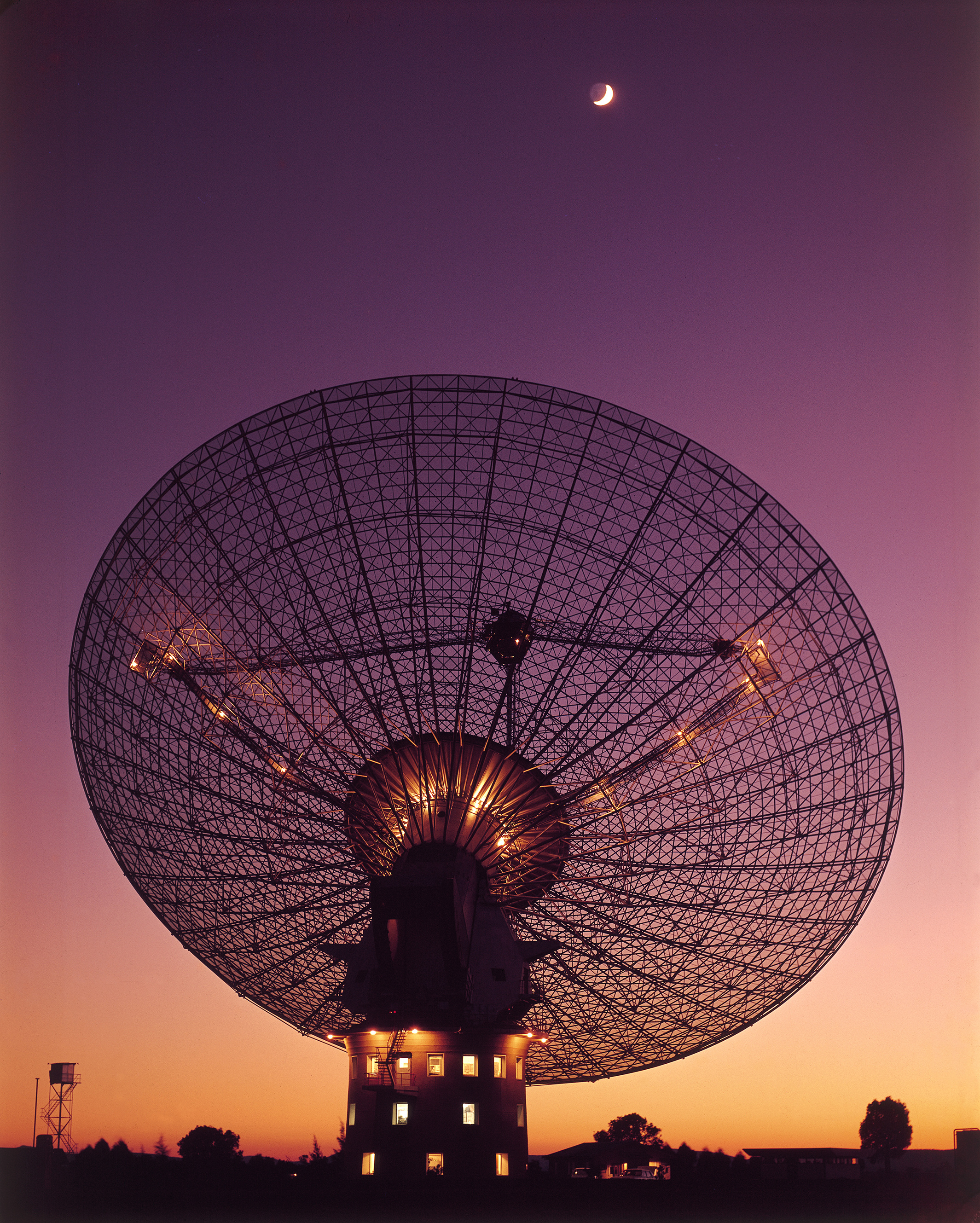
The 64-metre (210 ft) radio telescope at Parkes Observatory as seen in 1969, when it received signals from the Apollo 11 Moon landing

During the Apollo missions to the Moon, the Parkes Observatory was used to relay communication and telemetry signals to NASA, providing coverage for when the Moon was on the Australian side of the Earth.

The telescope also played a role in relaying data from the NASA Galileo mission to Jupiter that required radio-telescope support due to the use of its backup telemetry subsystem as the principal means to relay science data.

The observatory has remained involved in tracking numerous space missions up to the present day, including:

- Mariner 2
- Mariner 4
- Voyager missions (but no longer due to distance of the probes, only the 70-metre (230 ft) dish at the CDSCC can still communicate with the two Voyager probes, Voyager 1 and Voyager 2.)
- Giotto where it was the primary control and downlink for the mission to Halley's Comet
- Galileo
- Cassini-Huygens (until 2017)
- Artemis II where it tracked Artemis II in April 2026 as part of the ground station network organized by Intuitive Machines

To assist in a busy spaceflight period at the end of 2003 to early 2004, the Canberra Deep Space Communication Complex (CDSCC) incorporated the Parkes dish. NASA upgraded the antenna through the CDSCC with new receivers and equipment capable of handling transmissions from robotic spacecraft. When its research time allows, Parkes can act as a spare 'ear' for CDSCC during times of high activity. While being used thus it is designated as DSS (Deep Space Station)-49.

The CSIRO has made several documentaries on this observatory, with some of these documentaries being posted to YouTube.

=== Apollo 11 broadcast ===
ABC news report on the role of the Parkes telescope and the Honeysuckle Creek Tracking Station, a week before the Moon landing

When Buzz Aldrin switched on the TV camera on the Lunar Module, three tracking antennas received the signals simultaneously. They were the 64-metre (210 ft) Goldstone antenna in California, the 26-metre (85 ft) antenna at Honeysuckle Creek near Canberra in Australia, and the 64-metre (210 ft) dish at Parkes.

Since they started the spacewalk early, the Moon was only just above the horizon and below the visibility of the main Parkes receiver. Although they were able to pick up a quality signal from the off axis receiver, the international broadcast alternated between signals from Goldstone and Honeysuckle Creek, the latter of which ultimately broadcast Neil Armstrong's first steps on the Moon worldwide.

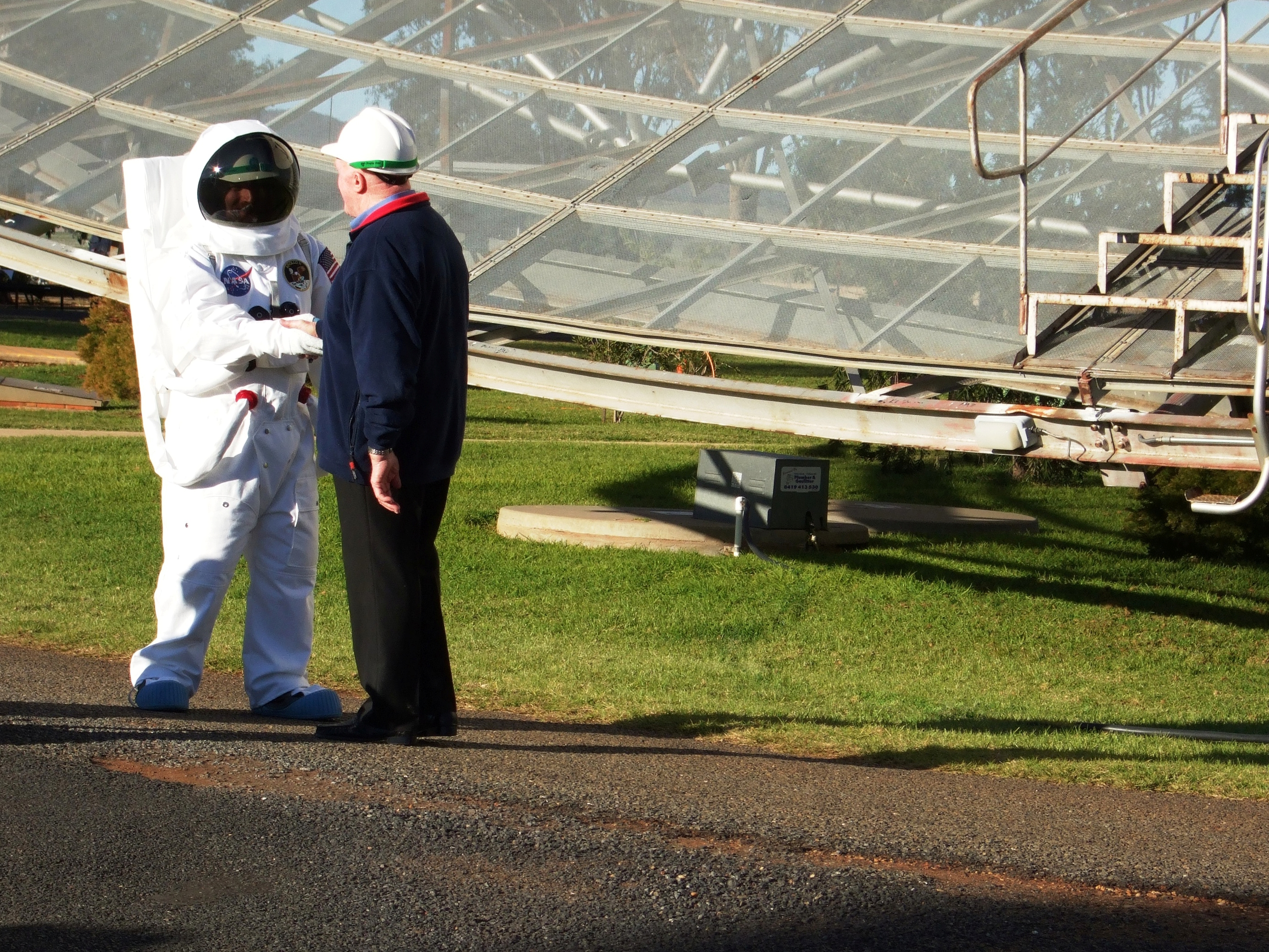
Celebrations on 19 July 2009 to mark the 40th anniversary of the Moon landing, and Parkes' role in it. "The Dish" behind is at full extension to the ground.

A little under nine minutes into the broadcast, the Moon rose far enough to be picked by the main antenna and the international broadcast switched to the Parkes signal. The quality of the TV pictures from Parkes was so superior that NASA stayed with Parkes as the source of the TV for the remainder of the 2.5-hour broadcast.

In the lead up to the landing wind gusts greater than 100 km/h (62 mph) were hitting the Parkes telescope, and the telescope operated outside safety limits throughout the moonwalk.

=== Mars rovers ===
In 2012 the observatory received special signals from the Mars rover Opportunity (MER-B), to simulate the Curiosity rover UHF radio. This helped prepare for the then upcoming Curiosity (MSL) landing in early August—it successfully touched down on 6 August 2012.

== Visitors Centre ==
The Parkes Observatory Visitors Centre allows visitors to view the dish as it moves. There are exhibits about the history of the telescope, astronomy, and space science, and a 3D movie theatre.

== Legacy ==
In 1995, the radio telescope was declared a National Engineering Landmark by Engineers Australia. The nomination cited its status as the largest southern hemisphere radio telescope, elegant structure, with features mimicked by later Deep Space Network telescopes, scientific discoveries and social importance through "enhancing [Australia's] image as a technologically advanced nation".

On Monday, 31 October 2011, Google Australia replaced its logo with a Google Doodle in honour of Parkes Observatory's 50th anniversary.

The Parkes Radio Telescope was added to the National Heritage List in 2020.

== In popular culture ==
- In 1964 the telescope featured in the opening credit sequence of The Stranger, Australia's first locally produced sci-fi TV series. Some scenes were also shot on location at the telescope and inside the observatory.
- The observatory and telescope were featured in the 2000 film The Dish, a fictionalised account of the observatory's involvement with the Apollo 11 Moon landing.
- The telescope is featured on the cover of Steve Hillage's 1977 album Motivation Radio.

== Wiradjuri names ==
In November 2020, in NAIDOC Week, the Observatory's three telescopes were given Wiradjuri names. The main telescope ("The Dish") is Murriyang, after the home in the stars of Biyaami, the creator spirit. The smaller 12m dish built in 2008 is Giyalung Miil, meaning "Smart Eye". The third, decommissioned antenna is Giyalung Guluman, meaning "Smart Dish".

== See also ==
- Apollo 11 missing tapes
- John Gatenby Bolton
- List of astronomical observatories
- List of radio telescopes
