= Australia Telescope National Facility =

- Alternative names: ATNF
- Location: New South Wales, AUS
- Coordinates: 30°18′54″S 149°33′42″E
- Website: www.atnf.csiro.au
- Telescopes: Australia Telescope Compact Array; Australian Square Kilometre Array Pathfinder; Mopra Telescope; Parkes Observatory
- Location of Australia Telescope National Facility

The Commonwealth Scientific and Industrial Research Organisation (CSIRO)'s radio astronomy observatories are collectively known as the Australia Telescope National Facility (ATNF), with the facility supporting Australia's research in radio astronomy. It is part of CSIRO's research unit known as CSIRO Space and Astronomy.

CSIRO currently operates four observatories as part of the ATNF. Three are in New South Wales near the towns of Parkes, Coonabarabran and Narrabri.The fourth telescope, the next generation Australian Square Kilometre Array Pathfinder (ASKAP) is located at the Inyarrimanha Ilgari Bundara, the Murchison Radio-astronomy Observatory in Western Australia. These telescopes can be used together as a long baseline array for use in very long baseline interferometry.

Radio telescopes included in the ATNF:

- The Australia Telescope Compact Array
- The Parkes Observatory
- The Mopra Telescope
- The Australian Square Kilometre Array Pathfinder

== See also ==
- Australian Space Agency
- List of radio telescopes
