= Radio Galaxy Zoo =

Citizen science project

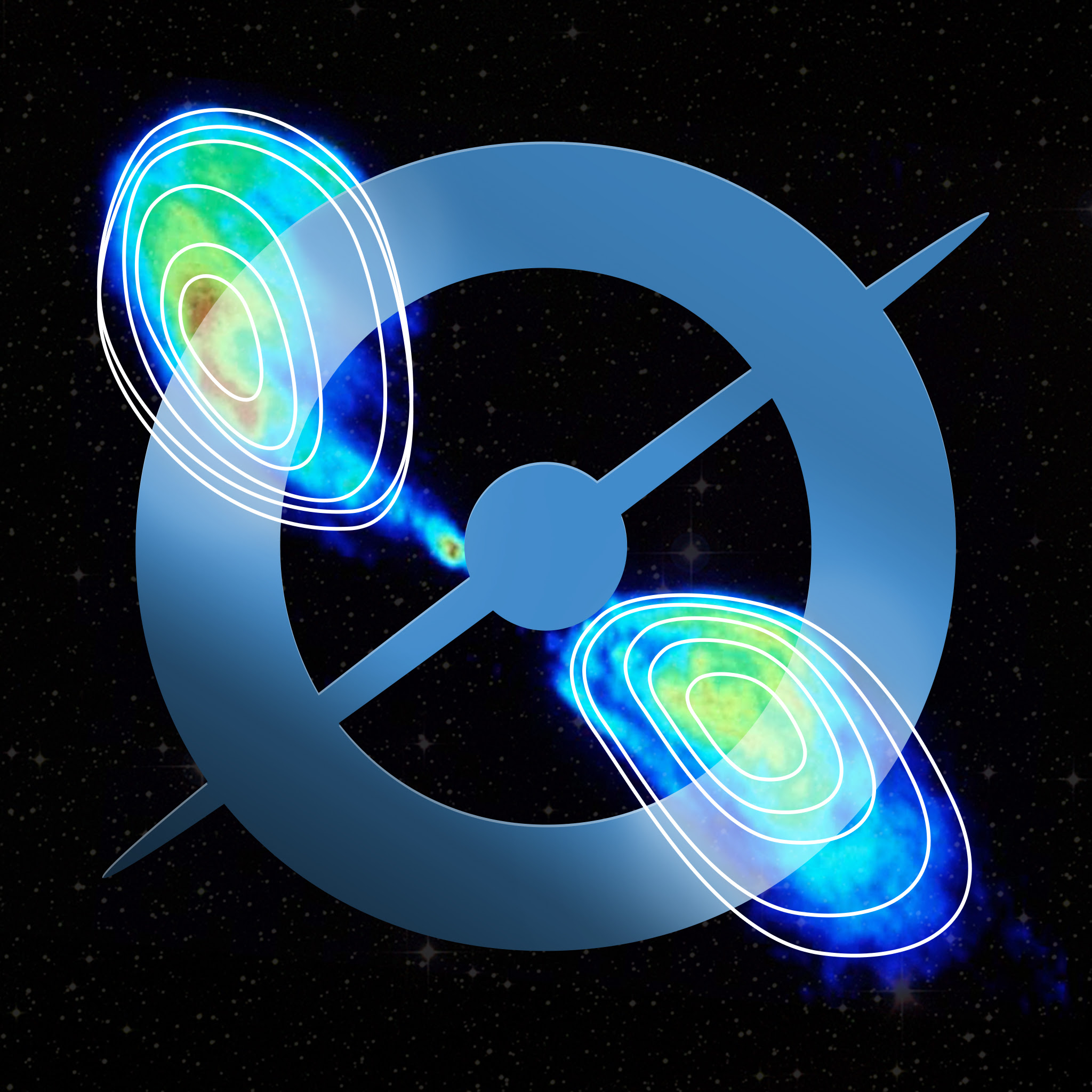
Radio Galaxy Zoo

Radio Galaxy Zoo (RGZ) is an internet crowdsourced citizen science project that seeks to locate supermassive black holes in distant galaxies. It is hosted by the web portal Zooniverse. The scientific team wants to identify black hole/jet pairs and associate them with the host galaxies. Using a large number of classifications provided by citizen scientists they hope to build a more complete picture of black holes at various stages and their origin. It was initiated in 2010 by Ray Norris in collaboration with the Zooniverse team, and was driven by the need to cross-identify the millions of extragalactic radio sources that will be discovered by the forthcoming Evolutionary Map of the Universe survey. RGZ is now led by scientists Julie Banfield and Ivy Wong. RGZ started operations on 17 December 2013, and ceased collecting new classifications on 1 May 2019.

== RGZ data sources ==
The Australia Telescope Compact Array

The project's scientific team are drawn mostly from Australia, with support from Zooniverse developers and other institutions. They use data taken by the Faint Images of the Radio Sky at Twenty-Centimeters (FIRST) survey which was observed at the Very Large Array between 1993 and 2011. Also used was data from the Australia Telescope Large Area Survey (ATLAS), taken with the Australia Telescope Compact Array (ATCA) in rural New South Wales. The infrared astronomy used was observed by Wide-field Infrared Survey Explorer (WISE) and the Spitzer Space Telescope.

== RGZ publications ==
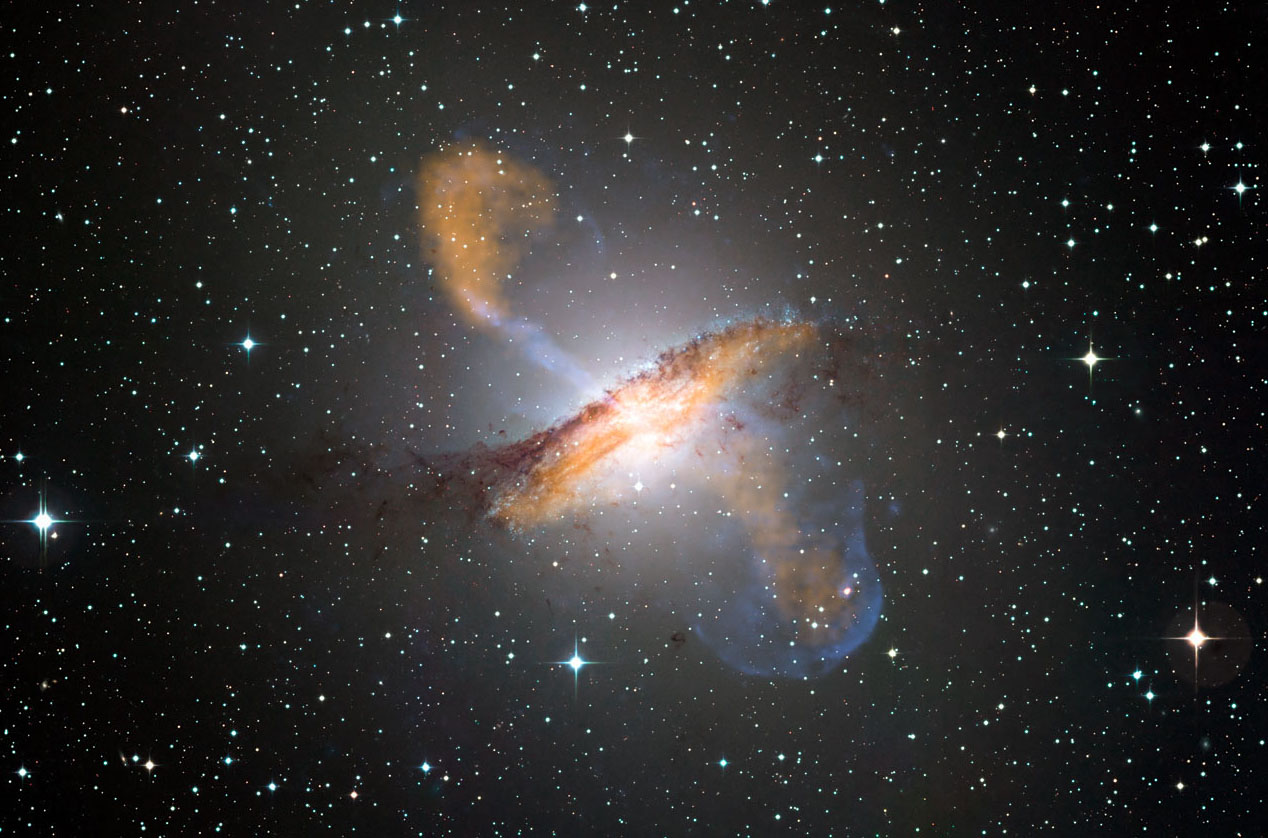
Image of a black hole's jets

RGZ has published five scientific papers (May 2018).

i) Radio Galaxy Zoo: host galaxies and radio morphologies derived from visual inspection. (November 2015)

The abstract begins: "We present results from the first twelve months of operation of Radio Galaxy Zoo, which upon completion will enable visual inspection of over 170,000 radio sources to determine the host galaxy of the radio emission and the radio morphology." It then explains that RGZ "uses 1.4GHz radio images from both the Faint Images of the Radio Sky at Twenty Centimeters (FIRST) and the Australia Telescope Large Area Survey (ATLAS) in combination with mid-infrared images at 3.4μm from the Wide-field Infrared Survey Explorer (WISE) and at 3.6μm from the Spitzer Space Telescope." Its aims are that when complete, RGZ will measure the relative populations and properties of host galaxies; processes that might also provide an avenue for finding radio structures that are rare and extreme.

On the International Centre for Radio Astronomy Research (ICRAR) website, an article from September 2015 named "Volunteer black hole hunters as good as the experts" explains how citizen scientists are as good as professionals at RGZ's tasks. The research team tested trained citizen scientists and ten professional astronomers using a hundred images to help quantify the quality of the data gathered. As the initial results were published, facts and figures from RGZ became available. More than 1.2 million radio images have been looked at, which enabled 60,000 radio sources to be matched to their host galaxies: "A feat that would have taken a single astronomer working 40 hours a week roughly 50 years to complete."

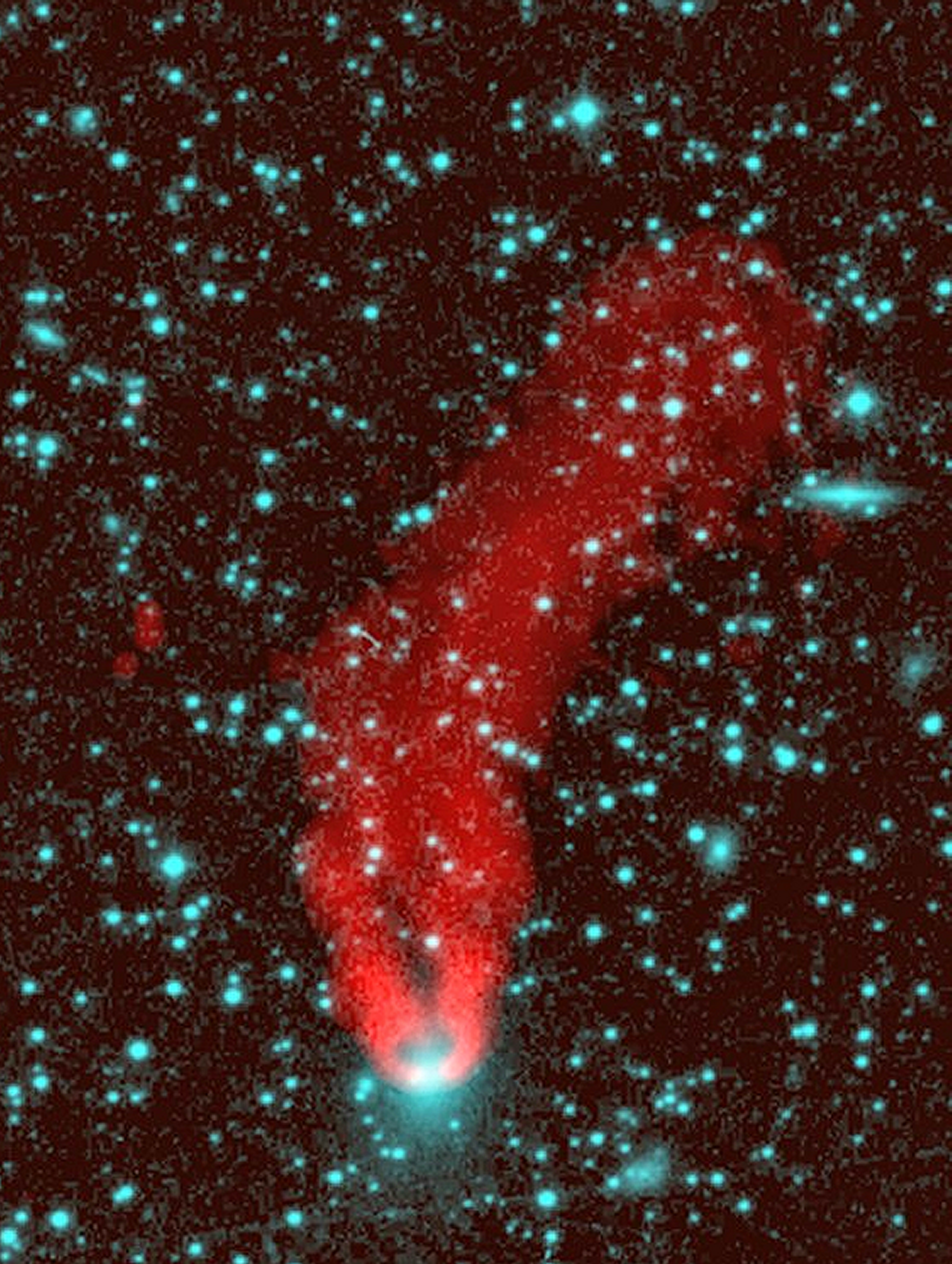
Radio Galaxy 3C 83.1B, an example of a wide-angle tail radio galaxy

ii) Radio Galaxy Zoo: discovery of a poor cluster through a giant wide-angle tail radio galaxy. (May 2016)

The abstract begins: "We have discovered a previously unreported poor cluster of galaxies (RGZ-CL J0823.2+0333) through an unusual giant wide-angle tail radio galaxy found in the Radio Galaxy Zoo project." It continues to explain that the analysis of 2MASX J08231289+0333016's surrounding environment indicates that it is within a poor cluster. Radio morphology suggests that, firstly, "the host galaxy is moving at a significant velocity with respect to an ambient medium like that of at least a poor cluster" and secondly that "the source may have had two ignition events of the active galactic nucleus with 10^7yrs in between." These suggestions reinforce the idea that there is an association between RGZ J082312.9+033301 and the newly discovered poor cluster.

On The Conversation website in an article "How citizen scientists discovered a giant cluster of galaxies", Ray Norris writes about the above study. He explains that two Russian citizen scientists (CSs), Ivan Terentev and Tim Matorny, were participating in RGZ when they noticed something odd with one of the radio sources. It became clear that the radio source the two CSs had found "was just one of a line of radio blobs that delineate a C-shaped “wide angle tail galaxy” (WATG)." Lead scientist Julie Banfield explained that this was "something that none of us had even thought would be possible."

WATGs are rare objects that are formed when jets of electrons from black holes, usually seen to be straight, are bent into a C shape by intergalactic gas. This characteristic shape is "a sure sign that there is intergalactic gas, signifying a cluster of galaxies, the largest known objects in the universe." The WATG discovered by Terentev and Matorny is one of the largest known and has led to the cluster being named after them. "This cluster, more than a billion light years away, contains at least 40 galaxies, marking an intersection of the sheets and filaments of the cosmic web that make up our universe." Clusters, despite their importance, are hard to find but the use of WATGs might be a way of finding more: However WATGs are rare.

On the National Radio Astronomy Observatory website, Matorny and Terentev commented on their discovery. “I am still amazed and feel more motivated to look for stunning new radio galaxies,” Matorny said. Terentev added, “I got a chance to see the whole process of science … and I have been a part of it!”

iii) Radio Galaxy Zoo: A Search for Hybrid Morphology Radio Galaxies. (December 2017)

The abstract begins: "Hybrid morphology radio sources are a rare type of radio galaxy that display different Fanaroff-Riley classes on opposite sides of their nuclei." The authors explain that RGZ has enabled them to discover 25 new candidate hybrid morphology radio galaxies (HyMoRS). These HyMoRS are at distances between redshifts z=0.14 and 1.0. Nine of the host galaxies have previous spectra and include quasars and a rare Green bean galaxy. It states: "Although the origin of the hybrid morphology radio galaxies is still unclear, this type of radio source starts depicting itself as a rather diverse class." The abstract ends:"While high angular resolution follow-up observations are still necessary to confirm our candidates, we demonstrate the efficacy of the Radio Galaxy Zoo in the pre-selection of these sources from all-sky radio surveys, and report the reliability of citizen scientists in identifying and classifying complex radio sources."

In an article on the ARC Centre of Excellence for All-Sky Astrophysics CAASTRO website named "Citizen scientists bag a bunch of 'two-faced' galaxies", the author explains the findings of the above study. The lead scientist is Anna Kapinska with CS Ivan Terentev named second. Kapinska's team have been looking for rare types of galaxies named Hybrid Morphology Radio Galaxies (HyMoRS). These show galaxy characteristics that are combined, rather than distinct. The article states: "Finding more HyMoRS helps us understand what kind of galaxy can turn out this way, and what gives them their unusual properties. Knowing that, in turn, helps us better understand how all galaxies evolve."

The first recognised HyMoRS was discovered in 2002 and since then 30 more. RGZ nearly doubled the discoveries by adding 25 more. Galaxies with black holes that produce jets are often "divided into two classes, Fanaroff-Riley I and Fanaroff-Riley II (or FR I and II). FR I galaxies have jets that fade away as they extend outwards, while FR II galaxies have jets that end in a bright, strongly-emitting region (a ‘hotspot’)." Explanations include the behaviour of the central black hole, different densities of matter in the surrounding environment or simply illusions because of different distances.

iv) Radio Galaxy Zoo: Cosmological Alignment of Radio Sources (November 2017)

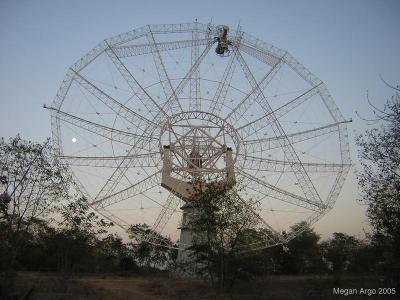
Giant Metrewave Radio Telescope

In November 2017, a team led by Omar Contigiani published a paper in Monthly Notices of the Royal Astronomical Society studying the mutual alignment of radio sources. Using data drawn from the Faint Images of the Radio Sky at Twenty Centimeters (FIRST) and TIFR GMRT Sky Survey (TGSS), they investigate the most powerful radio sources, namely the largest elliptical galaxies emitting plasma-filled jets. The abstract begins: "We study the mutual alignment of radio sources within two surveys, FIRST and TGSS. This is done by producing two position angle catalogues containing the preferential directions of respectively 30059 and 11674 extended sources distributed over more than 7000 and 17000 square degrees." The FIRST sample sources were identified by participants in RGZ, while the TGSS sample was the result of an automated process. Marginal evidence of local alignment is found in the FIRST sample, which has a 2% probability of being by chance. This supports other recent research by scientists using the Giant Metrewave Radio Telescope. The abstract ends: "The TGSS sample is found to be too sparsely populated to manifest a similar signal." Results suggest that there is a relative alignment present at cosmological distances.

v) Radio Galaxy Zoo: Compact and extended radio source classification with deep learning (May 2018).

In May 2018, Lukic and team published a study in Monthly Notices of the Royal Astronomical Society concerning machine learning techniques. The abstract begins: "Machine learning techniques have been increasingly useful in astronomical applications over the last few years, for example in the morphological classification of galaxies."

== Gems of the Galaxy Zoos (ZooGems) ==
During the next two years, up to 105 RGZ objects will be observed with the Hubble Space Telescope (HST) as a result of Program 15445, whose P.I. is William Keel. The program's abstract begins: "The classic Galaxy Zoo project and its successors have been rich sources of interesting astrophysics beyond their initial goals. Green Pea starbursts, AGN ionization echoes, dust in backlit spirals, AGN in pseudobulges, have all seen HST followup programs." As a result of NASA 'gap fillers' initiative, it is hoped that significant scientific progress can be made by HST observations of a total of 304 objects, which have been chosen by voters using a Zooniverse custom-made interface. Keel stated: "Each one of them might not be enough for an individual study, but when you put them all together it adds up to an interesting study."

Gems of the Galaxy Zoos finished in September 2023 after imaging 193 of the 300 candidates. Many of the images can be viewed on Wikimedia Commons.

== See also ==
- CSIRO
- Evolutionary Map of the Universe
- Galaxy formation and evolution
- Galaxy morphological classification
- Radio astronomy
