= Harney =

Harney may refer to:

== Places in the United States ==
- Harney, Maryland, an unincorporated community
- Harney, Minnesota, an unincorporated community
- Harney Basin, arid basin in south-east Oregon
- Harney County, Oregon
- Harney Lake, shallow alkali lake basin in south-east Oregon
- Harney National Forest (1911-1954), in South Dakota and Wyoming
- Fort Harney, a former U.S. Army outpost in Oregon
- Lake Harney, Florida
- Black Elk Peak formerly Harney Peak, highest mountain in South Dakota

== Other uses ==
- Harney (surname)
- Harney and Sons, American tea company based in Connecticut
- Harney Westwood & Riegels (or Harneys), law firm founded in 1960 in the British Virgin Islands
