= Bill Harney =

Bill Harney may refer to:

- William Edward Harney (1895–1962), Australian bushman and author
- Bill Yidumduma Harney (born 1931), Wardaman elder, astronomer, artist, and author, biological son of William Edward Harney
