= RAD@home =

Citizen science collaboratory

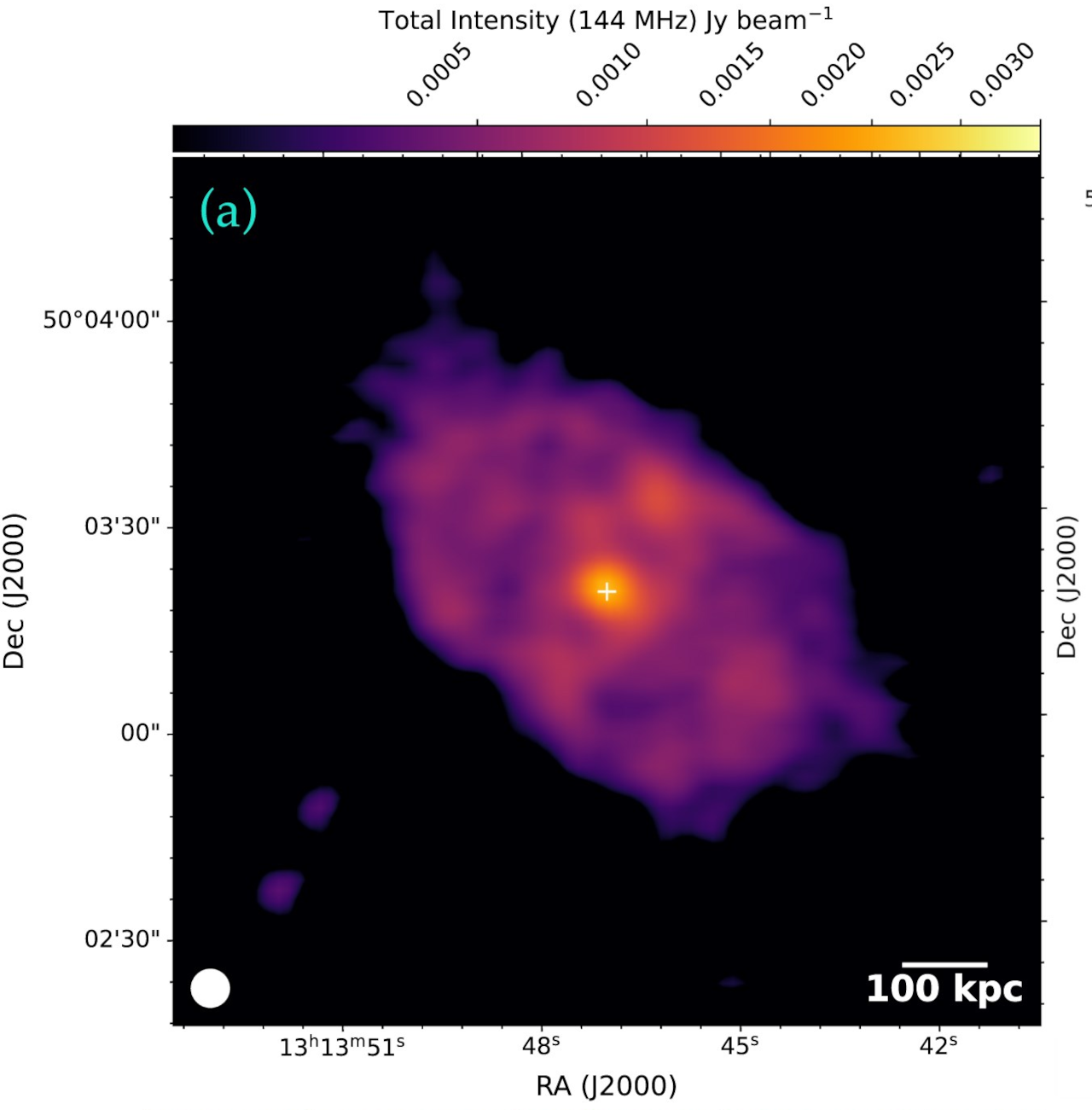
The twin ring Odd Radio Circle (ORC) RAD J131346.9+500320 discovered by RAD@home citizen science research collaboratory. This is currently (2025) the farthest and the most powerful ORC.

RAD@home is a citizen science research collaboratory in India and the first such collaboration in Indian astronomy. It focuses on training university science students to make radio astronomy discoveries using the GMRT, which is a SKA pathfinder radio telescope, and other telescopes operating in multiple bands of the electromagnetic spectrum. It was designed to help students and the public to understand multi-wavelength images of galaxies, taken primarily from radio surveys such as NVSS (1400 MHz) with the VLA and TGSS (150 MHz) with the GMRT.

- In 2022, the Collaboratory, led by its founder Ananda Hota, discovered a unique AGN where the radio jet appeared to hit a neighbouring galaxy and bounced back forming a mushroom-shaped radio bubble. Initial hints of this rare process had been seen in the archival data, but confirmation was not achieved until targeted observation with the GMRT telescope at 325 MHz, or 90 cm, band.
- In October 2025, the Collaboratory discovered the farthest and the most powerful odd radio circle (ORC), named RAD J131346.9+500320; it was also the first ORC to be discovered through citizen science. The ORC was spotted by trained citizen scientists analysing the 144 MHz radio images of the sky obtained by the European LOFAR radio telescope. This ORC was also the first to be discovered from LOFAR low frequency data.
- In June 2026, the Collaboratory reported the discovery of a Bow-and-Arrow-shaped Radio Galaxy (RAD-BAARG), designated RAD J104501.6+352852, in low-frequency radio images from the LoTSS survey taken with LOFAR. The proposed interpretation of its unusual morphology is that the bow-shaped structure represents a bow shock produced by the supersonic infall of the galaxy towards a nearby galaxy cluster, while the arrow-shaped structure is associated with the radio jet that is approximately aligned with the direction of motion of its host galaxy. Interaction between the jet-plasma and the bow shock is proposed to produce the curved radio structure which extends up to 1.8 million light years (560 kpc). The object was initially identified as an unusual radio galaxy by a trained citizen scientist living in a remote, hilly regions of the Himalayas, far from astronomical research institutes.
- The other kinds of astronomical objects that the Collaboratory has discovered and published include episodic radio galaxies (a.k.a. Double-Double Radio Galaxies), relic/remnant radio lobes, large radio lobes associated with spiral galaxies which can be compared to the exotic new class of radio galaxies known as Speca etc.

Other than contributing to scientific discoveries, the Collaboratory has also been recognised for its innovative approach to education and outreach in astronomy, particularly in radio astronomy. Through a combination of online and offline citizen science workshops, organised in collaboration with national research and educational institutes, it has trained thousands of Indian citizens and students to understand radio observations of galaxies using the GMRT. Following these workshops, trained citizen scientists (also known as e-astronomers and i-astronomers) continue their engagement by participating in weekend online e-classes. These e-classes further enable them to discover new radio sources, primarily using TGSS 150 MHz imaging data obtained with the GMRT. In follow-up observation proposals, these co-discovering e-/i-astronomers are included as formal co-investigators. Through this process, e-/i-astronomers also become co-authors on papers published by the Collaboratory that report citizen-science discoveries, with or without GMRT follow-up observations. Participation in genuine scientific discoveries has helped many students secure admission to Master's and PhD programmes, both in India and abroad. Thus, despite operating with zero dedicated funding and infrastructure, the Collaboratory has made significant contributions to human resource development and to preparing the next generation of astronomers for upcoming mega-facility projects such as the SKA.
