= PSR J0523−7125 =

Pulsar in the constellation Dorado

Observation data Epoch J2000 Equinox ICRS
- Constellation: Dorado
- Right ascension: 05^{h} 23^{m} 48.66^{s}
- Declination: −71° 25′ 52.58″

Characteristics
- Spectral type: Pulsar

Astrometry
Radial velocity (R_{v})	+456 rad m^{−2} km/s
Distance	160,000 ly (49,000 pc)

Details
Rotation	0.3225 s

Database references
SIMBAD	data

PSR J0523−7125 is a pulsar that, due to its size and brightness, was initially believed to be a distant galaxy. It is located about 160,000 light-years (49,000 parsecs) away in the southern constellation of Dorado, near the center of the Large Magellanic Cloud. Investigation via the Australian Square Kilometre Array Pathfinder showed the pulsar to have a high circular polarization with a steep spectrum. Its rotation measure is twice as large as any other pulsar found in the Large Magellanic Cloud, which also makes it one of the most luminous pulsars ever found.
