= Harney (surname) =

Harney is a surname of Irish origin. Notable people with the surname include:

- Ben Harney (1872–1938), American songwriter, entertainer, and pioneer of ragtime music
- Ben Harney (actor), American actor and dancer, active from 1972 to 1985
- Bill Harney (1895–1962), Australian bushman and author, born William Edward Harney
- Bill Yidumduma Harney (born 1931), Australian Aboriginal astronomer and artist, his biological son
- Corbin Harney (1920–2007), elder and spiritual leader of the Newe people, US
- Corinna Harney (born 1972), American model and actress
- Edward Harney (1865–1929), Irish lawyer who sat in both the Australian Senate and the British House of Commons
- Elise Harney (1925–1989), pitcher in the All-American Girls Professional Baseball League
- George Edward Harney (1840–1924), American architect
- George Julian Harney (1817–1897), English political activist, journalist, and Chartist leader
- John Hopkins Harney (1806–1868), Kentucky legislator
- John Milton Harney (1789–1825), American physician and poet, brother of William S. Harney
- John Paul Harney (a.k.a. Jean-Paul Harney) (1931–2012), professor and Canadian politician
- Mary Harney (born 1953), Irish politician
- Paul Harney (1929–2011), American professional golfer
- Richard "Hacksaw" Harney (1902–1973), American Delta blues guitarist and pianist
- Susan Harney (born 1946), American actress in Another World (TV series)
- William Edward Harney (1895–1962), Australian writer
- William S. Harney (1800–1889), cavalry officer in the U.S. Army
