= First Large Absorption Survey in HI =

Large-scale radio astronomy survey

The First Large Absorption Survey in HI (FLASH) is a large survey project conducted with CSIRO's Australian Square Kilometre Array Pathfinder telescope. FLASH was first proposed in 2011 by Elaine Sadler. and was soon joined by James Allison. Following the successful completion of the FLASH Pilot Survey, the main survey started in 2021 and was completed in 2026, making it the first of the eight ASKAP Survey Science Projects to be completed, ahead of the scheduled completion date of 2030. However, the data are not yet fully analyzed.

The aim of FLASH is to observe clouds of neutral hydrogen in absorption between the Earth and distant radio galaxies. The clouds, which might either be associated with the radio galaxies, or lie along the line of sight by chance, absorb radio waves at the hydrogen line absorption wavelength of 21 cm, but because of their great distance from Earth, they are redshifted to much longer wavelengths. Several hundred clouds are expected to be detected, which would enable studies of the evolution of galaxies, and provide an estimate of the density of hydrogen over cosmic time. The redshift range covered by FLASH is important because it is a period of the history of the Universe, between four and eight billion years ago, over which we have very little information. Galaxies that are detected by FLASH are then the subject of follow-up observations with other telescopes

== Survey Design ==
The original design of the FLASH survey was to observe the entire Southern sky south of declination +40° in the frequency range 712 - 1000 MHz, observing each field for 2 hours, so that it would detect hydrogen clouds in the redshift range z= 0.4-1.0. Several hundred intervening absorbers were expected to be detected, and about 2000 absorption systems associated with the emitting radio galaxy. Due to limits on the available observing time, the final survey observed the Southern sky south of declination +15°, excluding the Galactic plane. The final survey covers 25,000 square degrees of sky, delivering about 150,000 radio spectra.

After validation, all data from FLASH is placed into the public domain via the CSIRO Data Access Portal.

== Results ==
FLASH has so far resulted in over 40 published papers. Highlights include:

- The discovery in 2015 using the ASKAP BETA array of neutral hydrogen absorption in a young radio galaxy at a redshift of 0.44
- The discovery in 2020 using FLASH Early science observations of an intervening cloud of neutral hydrogen at a redshift of 0.36
- The discovery in 2022-24 using the FLASH Pilot Survey of several neutral hydrogen systems associated with bright radio sources
- A catalogue in 2026 of multi-wavelength properties and photometric redshifts of radio continuum sources from the FLASH survey.
