= Ray Norris (astrophysicist) =

Australian astronomer

Ray Norris is an astrophysicist and science communicator, based at the CSIRO Australia Telescope National Facility, and Western Sydney University, and conducts research in astrophysics and Aboriginal Astronomy.

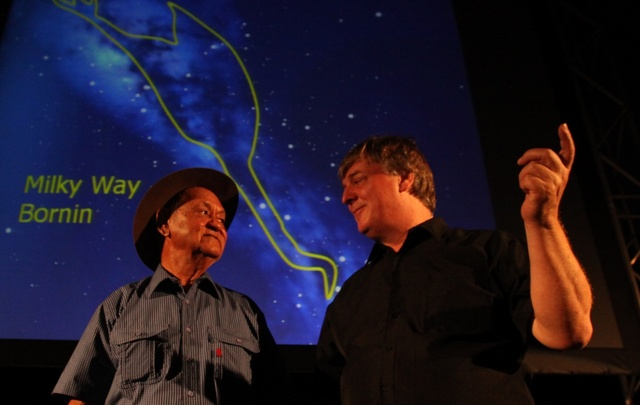
Bill Yidumduma Harney and Ray Norris at the First Astronomers show at the Darwin Festival

== Early life ==
Ray Norris was born in London and grew up in Brookmans Park, Hertfordshire, England in 1953. He attended high school at St. Albans School and then went to Cambridge University, where he received an honours degree in theoretical physics.

He then went to the Jodrell Bank Observatory of the University of Manchester where he received his PhD in radio-astronomy in 1978, working on astrophysical masers. At the same time, he started to develop an interest in the archaeoastronomy of Stonehenge and other megalithic observatories, joined a group of students led by Clive Ruggles and spent several years surveying the stone circles of the British Isles.

== Career ==
He moved to Australia in 1983 to work for the CSIRO Australia Telescope National Facility. He was appointed as head of astrophysics in 1994, and deputy director in 2000. In 2001 he led the successful bid for Australian astronomy under the Australian federal government’s “Major National Research Facilities” program, and then became director of the Australian astronomy MNRF. In 2005 he resigned from management positions to return to research. In 2013 he retired from CSIRO but was appointed as a CSIRO Honorary Fellow. In 2015 he was appointed as a Research Professor at Western Sydney University.

== Writing ==
Norris has published over 540 academic papersand has an h-index of 71.

He has also published the following books:

- Bioastronomy 2002: Life among the stars (2004) by Ray P. Norris and F. Stootman
- Emu Dreaming: An Introduction to Aboriginal Astronomy (2009), by Ray Norris and Cilla Norris
- The novel, Graven Images by Ray Norris (2011).
- Big Sky: When the Emu left the Earth (2026) by Bruce Pascoe and Ray Norris

== Aboriginal Astronomy ==
Norris is well known for his work on Aboriginal Astronomy, and was an adjunct professor in the department of Indigenous Studies at Macquarie University. His work has featured in many radio and TV programs, including ABC TV's Message Stick, and ABC Radio National's The First Astronomers. In August 2009 he featured in a two-man The First Astronomers show with Wardaman elder Bill Yidumduma Harney at the Darwin Festival..

== Astrophysics ==
From 2000 to 2005 Norris led the Australia Telescope Large Area Survey (ATLAS) project, imaging the faintest radio galaxies and star-forming galaxies in the universe, to understand how they form and evolve.

In 2009 he led a team that proposed the EMU project, operating on the new ASKAP telescope to survey of the sky at radio wavelengths, and led the EMU project until he stepped down in 2020. He also researches cosmology and dark energy.

In 2020 he led a team that discovered previously unknown circles of radio emission in the sky, which they called "Odd radio circles".

== Sources ==
- http://www.atnf.csiro.au/people/rnorris/
- http://science.uniserve.edu.au/faces/norris/norris.html
- http://www.emudreaming.com/about.htm
- Norris, R.P. & Hamacher, D.W., 2009,"The Astronomy of Aboriginal Australia", In "The Role of Astronomy in Society and Culture", edited by D. Valls-Gabaud & A. Boksenberg. Cambridge University Press, pp. 39-47.
- "Emu Dreaming" by Ray Norris & CIlla Norris, ISBN 978-0-9806570-0-5
- ABC TV Message Stick transcript on web
- ABC Radio National "The First Astronomers" transcript on web
- Ri Aus - people in Science
