= RAD J131346.9+500320 =

Odd radio circle in the constellation Canes Venatici

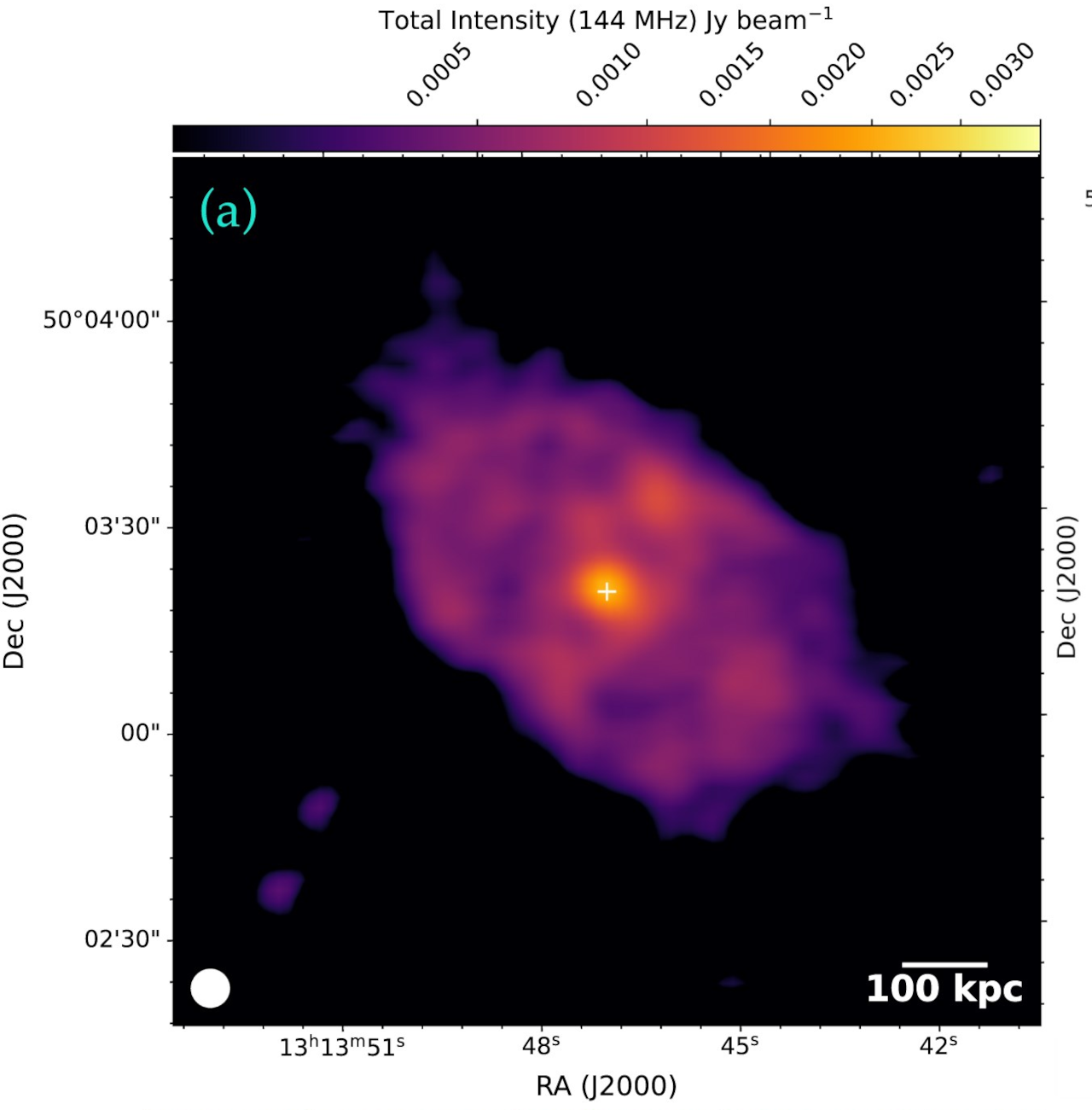
- RAD J131346.9+500320 is an example of an 'odd radio circle' (ORC). It is the most distant and powerful ORC yet found.
- Object type: Odd radio circle

Observation data (Epoch J2000)
- Constellation: Canes Venatici
- Right ascension: 13^{h} 13^{m} 51^{s}
- Declination: +50° 04′ 00″
- Distance: 7.7 billion light years

RAD J131346.9+500320 (RAD J131346) is an odd radio circle (ORC) located in the constellation Canes Venatici approximately 7.7 billion light-years from Earth. It consists of two intersecting rings, each spanning 300,000 light-years, surrounded by an even larger radio cloud extending nearly 3 million light-years. It is the most distant and powerful ORC yet observed, and is the first ORC identified through citizen science collaboration.

== Discovery and observational details ==
=== Citizen science breakthrough ===
RAD J131346 was discovered on June 11, 2024, during an online training session of the RAD@home Astronomy Collaboratory, a pioneering citizen science initiative based in Mumbai, India. The discovery emerged through visual inspection of low-frequency continuum maps from the LOFAR Two-metre Sky Survey (LoTSS) DR2, when participants identified two intersecting ring-like structures centered on a compact radio core. Founded in 2013 by Dr. Ananda Hota, the platform operates under zero-funding, zero-infrastructure.

=== LOFAR telescope observations ===
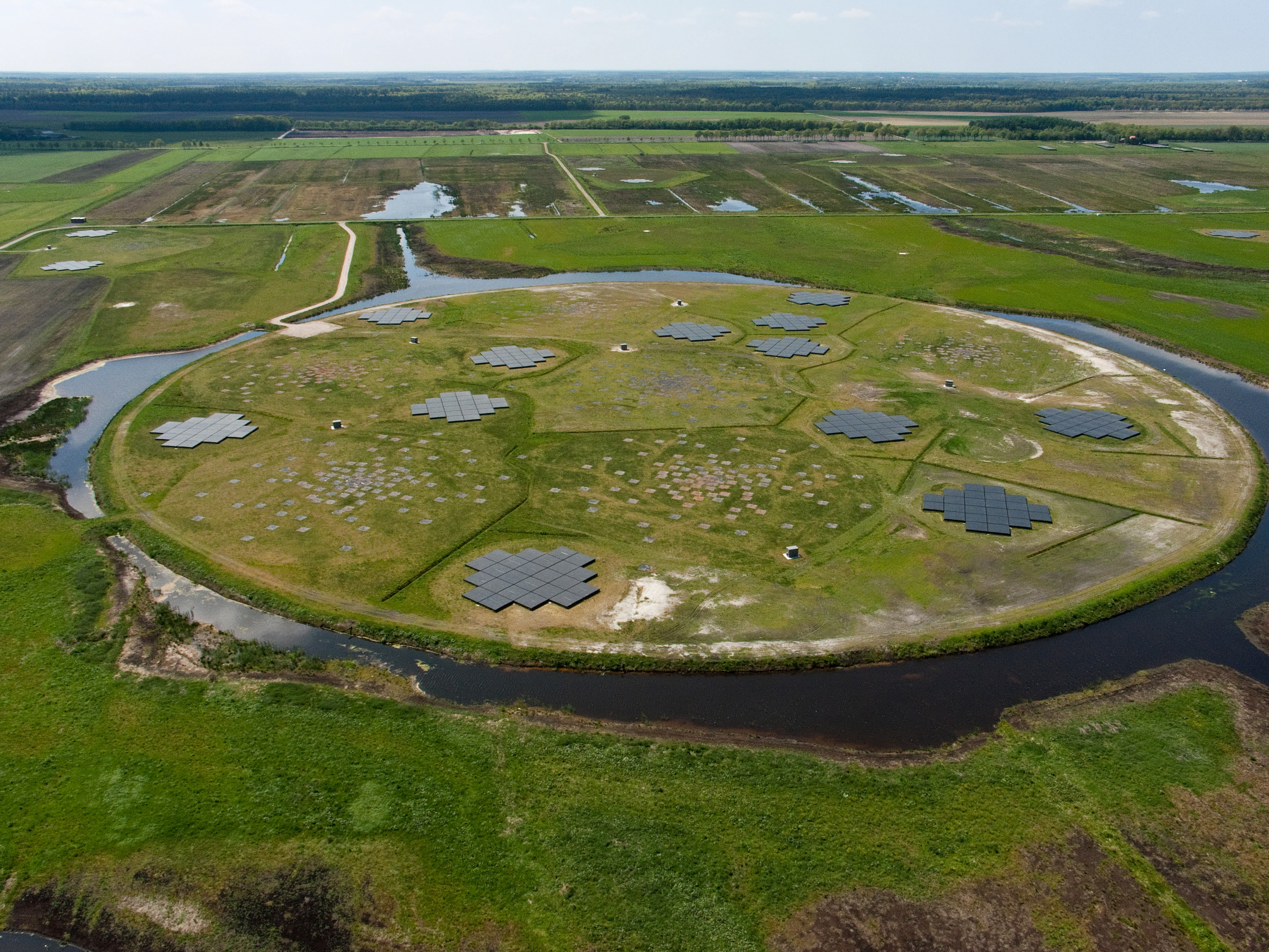
The LOFAR core near Exloo, Netherlands.

The detection was made possible through the Low Frequency Array (LOFAR), the world's largest and most sensitive radio telescope operating at low frequencies between 10 and 240 MHz. LOFAR consists of 52 antenna stations distributed across eight European countries, creating a pan-European interferometer with unparalleled sensitivity and angular resolution at these frequencies.

LOFAR's innovative design utilizes thousands of simple antennas without moving parts, with signals digitally combined in software to create radio images. This revolutionary approach provides more than two orders of magnitude better sensitivity than previous telescopes at these frequencies, making it ideally suited for detecting faint, extended radio structures like ORCs.

== Physical characteristics and structure ==
=== Ring system properties ===
RAD J131346 exhibits a double-ring morphology, with each ring measuring approximately 300 kiloparsecs (approximately 978,000 light-years) in diameter. The entire structure extends over 800 kiloparsecs (2.6 million light-years), embedded within diffuse emission that rivals the size of giant radio galaxies.

The twin rings display mild brightness enhancements at their intersection points, suggesting complex interaction between the overlapping structures. This configuration represents only the second known example of an ORC with intersecting rings, making it exceptionally rare among the handful of confirmed ORCs discovered to date.

=== Spectral analysis and power ===
Detailed spectral analysis reveals steep radio spectra with spectral indices of α_{54}^{144} = 1.22 ± 0.15 and α_{144}^{1400} = 1.20 ± 0.10. These consistently steep values across a wide frequency range support interpretation of the emission as aged synchrotron plasma, characteristic of relic emission rather than ongoing jet activity.

The integrated radio luminosity reaches 2.27 × 10^{26} W Hz^{−1} at 144 MHz, making it nearly two orders of magnitude more powerful than other known ORCs, which typically exhibit luminosities in the range 10^{23}–10^{24} W Hz^{−1}. This power, combined with its high redshift of z ≈ 0.94, establishes RAD J131346 as both the most distant and most powerful ORC identified to date.

== Host galaxy and environment ==
=== Central galaxy properties ===
The radio emission originates from a faint optical galaxy (SDSS J131346.92+500319.3) with a photometric redshift of z = 0.937 ± 0.045. The central compact radio core exhibits a flat spectrum with spectral index ≈ -0.3, typical of active radio galaxy cores, and contributes 1.75 ± 0.18 mJy to the total flux density of 43.2 ± 4.1 mJy.

=== Galaxy cluster environment ===
The host galaxy resides within a galaxy group or poor cluster at redshift z ≈ 0.9, containing at least 15 galaxies with similar redshifts. This cluster environment, with a mass of approximately 10^{14} solar masses, provides crucial environmental context for understanding ORC formation mechanisms.

The presence of multiple galaxies with concordant redshifts within the ORC structure suggests that environmental density gradients and possible jet-galaxy interactions play central roles in shaping these ring morphologies. All three objects discovered in this study—including RAD J131346—are found in galaxy clusters of similar mass, highlighting the importance of cluster environments in ORC formation.

== Formation mechanisms and theoretical models ==
=== Relic synchrotron origin ===
The steep radio spectrum and morphological characteristics strongly support a relic synchrotron origin for RAD J131346. ORCs are best understood as fossil radio shells that have been re-energized by external or internal processes, such as large-scale shocks induced by galaxy mergers, black hole mergers, or powerful superwinds.

=== Superwind model ===
Recent theoretical work proposes that the rings may be linked to superwind outflows from spiral host radio galaxies. If a bipolar superwind from the spiral host initiates after radio lobes have reached a remnant phase, twin radio rings can form and expand to ORC dimensions over hundreds of millions of years.

This model draws parallels to smaller-scale analogues like NGC 3079, where a polarized radio ring sits within a wind-blown radio bubble. Scaling up such processes under permissive environmental conditions could produce ORC-sized structures, particularly when involving "Speca-like" radio galaxies hosted by optically red disk galaxies capable of multiple episodes of growth.

=== Black hole feedback mechanisms ===
The formation of ORCs likely involves complex feedback processes between supermassive black holes and their host galaxies. Supermassive black holes can drive powerful jets and winds that interact with surrounding gas, creating shock waves and bubble-like structures.

Recent studies demonstrate that black hole jets can rapidly change direction within timescales of just one million years, potentially creating complex radio structures through multiple episodes of activity.
