= Elaine Sadler =

Australian astrophysicist

Elaine M. Sadler AO
- Education: University of Queensland, Australian National University
- Occupation: Astrophysicist

Elaine Margaret Sadler AO FAA is an Australian astrophysicist. She is the Australia Telescope National Facility Chief Scientist and a professor of astrophysics in the School of Physics at the University of Sydney. She was elected as a fellow of the Australian Academy of Science (AAS) in 2010 and commenced a 4-year term as Foreign Secretary of the AAS in 2018. She was previously director of the CAASTRO centre (2014–2018). Sadler is a member of the International Astronomical Union and served as the President Division VIII Galaxies & the Universe from 2009 to 2012.

== Biography ==
Sadler's interest in astronomy developed when she was eight years old and received a book with photographs of telescopes and the Universe, which "got [her] thinking about big questions." At age 11, she joined the local amateur astronomical society in Guildford, England, where she was the youngest member.

Sadler studied physics at the University of Queensland, where she received her undergraduate degree. She received her PhD in astronomy from Australian National University in 1983. Following graduation, she worked at the European Southern Observatory and Kitt Peak National Observatory before moving to the Australian Astronomical Observatory. In 1993, she began working at the University of Sydney. Receiving three ARC Fellowships, she "had time to carry out research projects with a broad scope." With a team of colleagues, Sadler developed a radio atlas of the entire southern sky, using the University of Sydney's Molonglo Observatory Synthesis Telescope, which is now used by astronomers internationally.

In her role directing CAASTRO, she oversaw "a network of over 100 scientists and more than 40 research students across CAASTRO's seven university nodes (at the University of Sydney, Australia National University, Curtin University, University of Melbourne, University of Queensland, Swinburne University of Technology and University of Western Australia) and eleven Australian and overseas partner institutions."

In July 2015, Sadler's research team found a 5-billion-year-old galaxy using the CSIRO's Australian Square Kilometre Array Pathfinder.

In 2019, Sadler was appointed as an Officer of the Order of Australia for services to astrophysics and gender equality.

Sadler's primary research areas include galaxy evolution and active galaxies.

== Publications ==
As of may 2026 Sadler has published over 340 academic papers and has an h-index of 76.
