= Harney National Forest =

Former National Forest in South Dakota, US

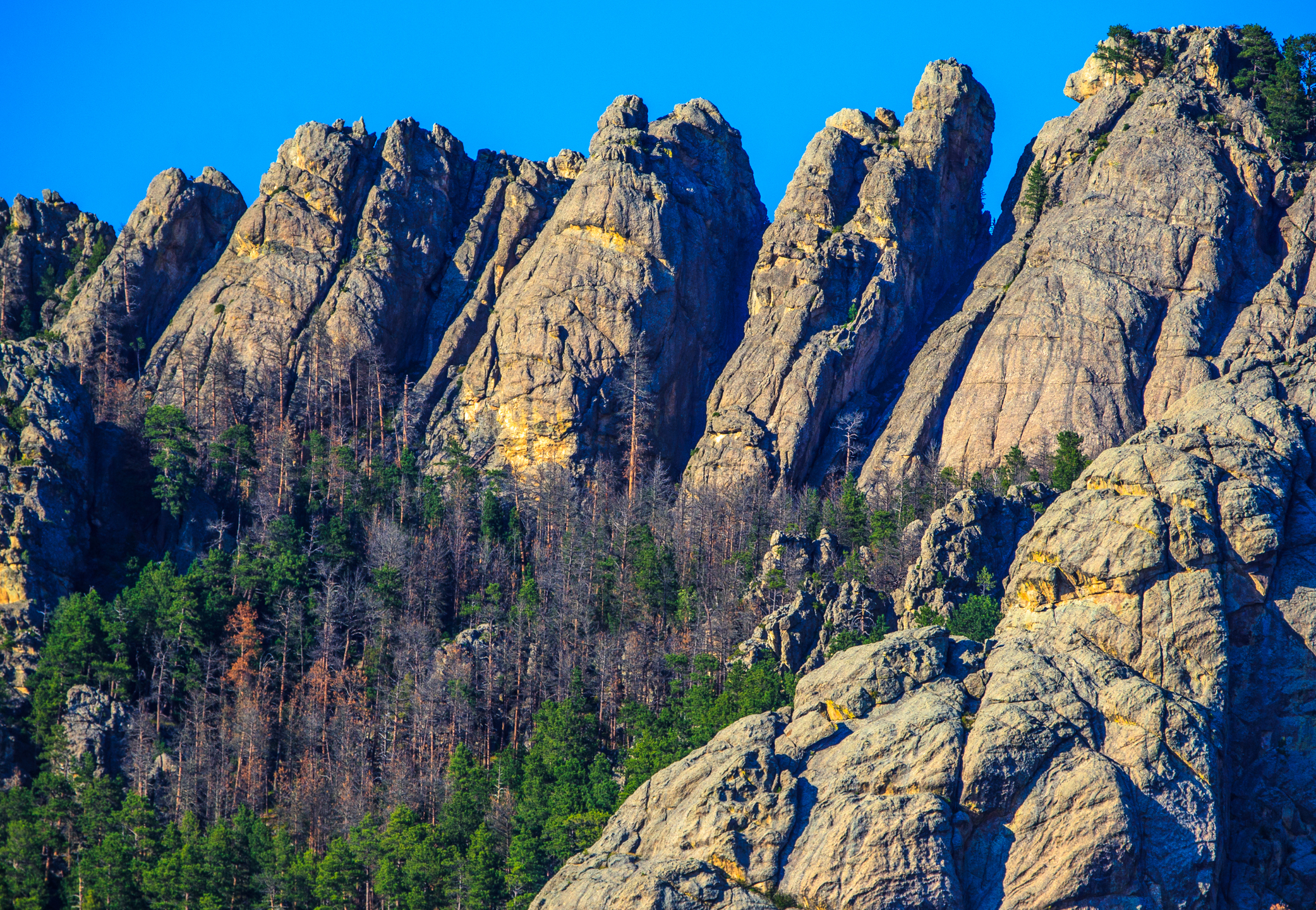

- Location within the United States

Geography
- Location: Southwestern South Dakota; Southeastern Wyoming; United States
- Coordinates: 43°56′11″N 103°43′40″W
- Area: 642,550 acres (260,030.8 ha)

Administration
- Established: July 1, 1911
- Authority: United States Forest Service

Harney National Forest was established by the U.S. Forest Service in South Dakota and Wyoming on July 1, 1911, with 642,550 acres (2,600.3 km^{2}) from part of Black Hills National Forest and other lands. On July 1, 1954, the entire forest was added to Black Hills and the name was discontinued.

== See also ==
- Custer, South Dakota
- Custer State Park
- French Creek
- Keystone, South Dakota
