= Evolutionary Map of the Universe =

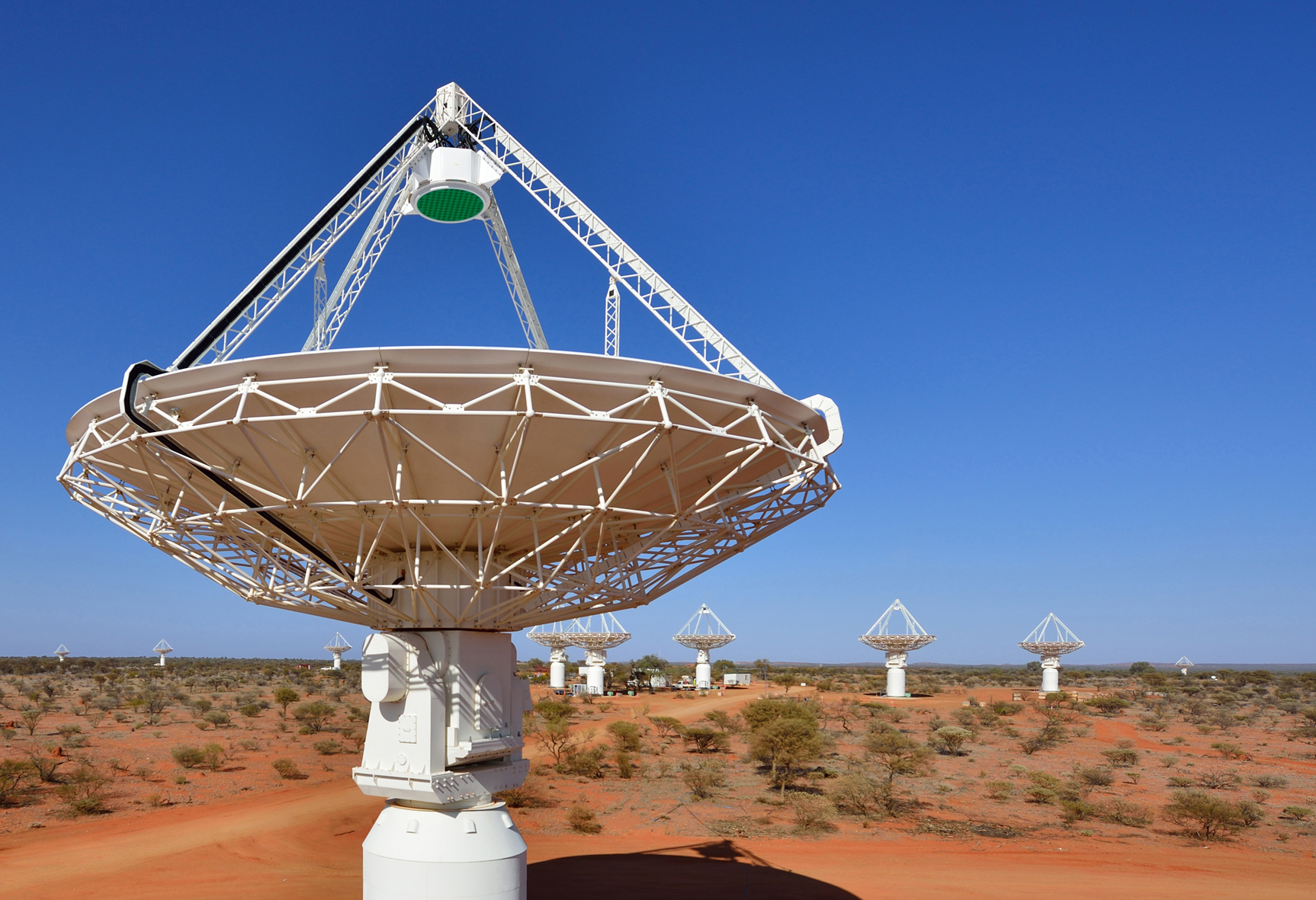
Australian Square Kilometre Array Pathfinder (ASKAP) radio telescope array

Evolutionary Map of the Universe, or EMU, is a large project which will use the new ASKAP telescope to make a census of radio sources in the sky. EMU is expected to detect about 70 million radio sources. Most of these radio sources will be galaxies millions of light years away, many containing massive black holes, and some of the signals detected will have been sent less than half a billion years after the Big Bang, which created the universe 13.7 billion years ago. Unlike the NVSS, which mainly detected active galactic nuclei, the greater sensitivity of EMU means that about half the galaxies detected will be star-forming galaxies.

EMU's primary science driver is to try to understand how the stars and galaxies were first formed, and how they evolved to their present state. The census of 70 million galaxies detected by EMU will represent galaxies in all their different stages of evolution, so that they can be placed in sequence, enabling the study of how their properties change as they evolve. EMU will be able to probe star forming galaxies up to a redshift of about 1, active galactic nuclei to the edge of the observable universe, and will undoubtedly uncover new classes of object.

EMU was chosen (with WALLABY) as one of the two highest-ranked proposals for ASKAP from an initial field of 39 expressions of interest. EMU is an international project, and the EMU team consists of over 400 astronomers in 21 countries.

In addition to planning and conducting the radio survey itself, the EMU project also includes

- Key Science Projects, which will deliver the key science goals from EMU. These include Galaxy Evolution, Cosmology, Galaxy Clusters, the Galactic Plane, and Radio Stars.
- Development Projects, which are developing and optimising the tools needed to generate the science from the EMU data. These include source extraction, cross-identification with multi-wavelength catalogues, and redshift determination. One such development project has resulted in the creation of the Radio Galaxy Zoo citizen science project.
- Collaboration Projects, which develop and maintain collaborations with other large survey projects such as Meerkat-Mightee, MWA-GLEAM, LOFAR, SkyMapper, WISE, and eRosita.
- The WTF project, which will mine the EMU data for unexpected discoveries that are not included in the science goals.

== History ==
The EMU project was proposed in 2009 by a team led by Ray Norris. It was ranked by ASKAP in the top two of ten Survey Science projects, with Norris the Project Leader, and A. Hopkins and N. Seymour as Project Scientists. Seymour stepped down in 2018, and Norris stepped down in 2020. Currently, Andrew Hopkins is the Project Leader. The EMU team now has over 400 members.

== Technical Overview ==
EMU is a radio sky survey project which will use the new ASKAP telescope to make a deep (~10 microJy rms) radio continuum survey covering the entire Southern Sky as far north as declination +30°. It will have about 40 times the sensitivity, and six times the resolution, of the NVSS”, and will also be more sensitive to extended diffuse emission, because of the short baselines built into the ASKAP array.

EMU will survey the entire sky visible from the ASKAP telescope in 30 square degree fields. Each field will be surveyed over the 300 MHz band from about 1110 to 1410 MHz, in 1 MHz channels, delivering both spectral shapes and, through the POSSUM project, all four Stokes parameters and rotation measures. The data will be processed in near-real-time by the ASKAP pipeline processor. After the processed data have been approved for quality control by the EMU team, they will be placed in the public domain. The radio components will then be grouped into radio sources, and where possible cross-matched with other multiwavelength data. They will then be placed into the EMU value-added catalogue (EVACAT) which will be available only to members of the EMU team for some proprietary period before being released into the public domain.

== TimelineThe EMU project has five phases (dates are notional, and depend on construction and commissioning progress) ==
- EMU Phase 1: Design Study (2008-2015): The EMU design study examined issues such as simulating the performance of the phased-array-feed, developing high-dynamic-range imaging algorithms, source extraction and identification, etc. It also conducts pilot science experiments on fields such as the ATLAS, SCORPIO, and COSMOS fields, to guide the ultimate EMU science.
- EMU Phase 2: BETA Commissioning (2013-2015) The EMU team contributed enthusiastically to the ASKAP Commissioning process, including using the 6-antenna Boolardy Test Array (BETA) to make the first observations, debugging the telescope and its processing.
- EMU Phase 3: ASKAP-12 Commissioning: In 2016, a science-ready ASKAP ("ASKAP-12") was delivered with 12 of the 36 antennas equipped with ADE ("MkII") PAFs (in addition to the six antennas equipped with BETA PAFs, which are not expected to be used). A significant period of commissioning and debugging the instrument ensued.
- EMU Phase 4: Early Science: The first survey science observations will be made with the ASKAP-12 array, starting in early 2016. A number of science projects were observed ed, resulting in a number of journal papers.. During this period the additional antennas were progressively equipped with PAFs.
- EMU Phase 5: Pilot Surveys. The first EMU Pilot Field was observed in 2019–2020, and a paper presenting the main results was published. Several science papers have been published, including the discovery of Odd Radio Circles.
- EMU Phase 5: Full Survey Science: (2022). The EMU survey observations themselves are expected to take up to 5 years of telescope time. It is hoped eventually that WALLABY data will be able to be combined with EMU data to obtain an even more sensitive uimage of the sky.
