= ARC Centre of Excellence for All-Sky Astrophysics =

ARC Centre of Excellence for All-Sky Astrophysics (or CAASTRO) was a collaboration of international astronomers dedicated to wide field astronomy. It was formally launched on 12 September 2011, at Sydney Observatory and ceased in 2018.

== Aims ==
CAASTRO aimed to be an international leader in wide-field astronomy. It planned to deliver transformational new science by bringing together unique expertise in radio astronomy, optical astronomy, theoretical astrophysics and computation.

== Programmes ==
CAASTRO pursued three interlinked scientific programmes, each of which could be addressed only with the all-sky perspective provided by wide-field telescopes:

- The Evolving Universe: When did the first galaxies form, and how have they then evolved?
- The Dynamic Universe: What is the high-energy physics that drives change in the Universe?
- The Dark Universe: What are the Dark Energy and Dark Matter that dominate the cosmos?

== Participants ==
CAASTRO was an Australian initiative, led by The University of Sydney, in conjunction with the Australian National University, the University of Melbourne, the University of Western Australia, the University of Queensland, Curtin University and Swinburne University of Technology, complemented by a group of Australian and international partners. It was funded by the Australian Research Council, by the NSW Government and by the member organisations.

CAASTRO's founding Director was Professor Bryan Gaensler. He was succeeded by Professor Elaine Sadler from The University of Sydney in September 2014.

== See also ==
- List of astronomical societies
