= Bill Yidumduma Harney =

Aboriginal Australian artist

Bill Yidumduma Harney AM (born c. 1931), also known as Bill Harney Yidumduma, formerly Bill Harney, is an elder of the Wardaman people, known as an artist, storyteller, and musician.

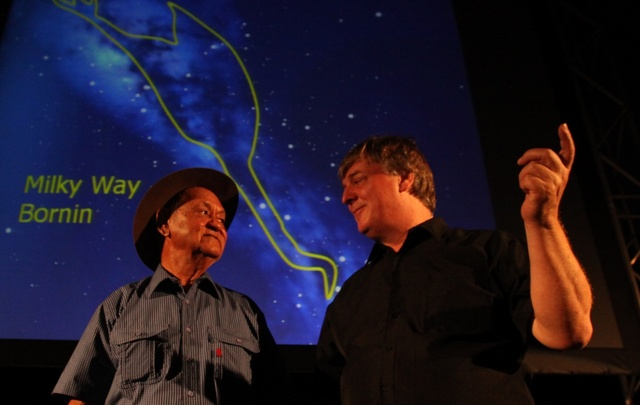
Bill Yidumduma Harney and Ray Norris at the First Astronomers show at the Darwin Festival

As of 2022, he lives at Menngen Station, near Katherine in the Northern Territory of Australia, which lies in the traditional lands of the Wardaman people.

== Early life and education ==
Bill Harney Yidumduma (formerly known as Bill Harney and also known as Bill Yidumduma Harney ) was born around 1931 at Brandy Bottle Creek, on Willeroo Station, NT. His biological father was the Irish-Australian writer William Edward Harney, but he was brought up in a traditional Aboriginal community by his adoptive Aboriginal father, Joe Jomornji, and mother, Ludi Yibuluyma. His sister was taken as part of the Stolen Generations, but he escaped because his mother covered him in charcoal to hide the whiteness of his skin.

From the age of 12 Harney worked as a stockman on cattle stations owned by the Vestey Brothers. Between the ages of 13 and 19, he was trained to paint Wardaman styles of rock art and body painting by the Wardaman Elders during his initiation.

== Art and tourism ==
From 1974 until 1994, Harney lived in Katherine. He formed a business as an artist and supplier of didjeridus, to support his extended family, comprising around 60 dependants. He later became a tour operator, and in 2004, he won the Brolga Award for Tourism.

From 1979 he worked as an artist, painting on both bark and canvas, using ochre paint. He has had works selected for the National Aboriginal & Torres Strait Islander Art Awards many times. His work has long been represented at Mimi Aboriginal Art and Craft in Katherine.

In 1989, Harney's first major solo painting exhibition was held at Darwin Museum, which bought a large sculpture. In 1990 another exhibition of his work, with a work called Junganninna (creation story) was sold to Parliament House in Darwin. Parliament House in Sydney also bought one of his paintings.

== Land rights ==
In 1999 Harney won land rights for the Wardaman people over the cattle station at Menngen, formerly Innesvale Station. As of 2024, the Wardaman Aboriginal Corporation, with Bill Harney as the chair, runs Menngen.

== Aboriginal teachings and awards ==
Harney is well known as an advocate and ambassador for Aboriginal Australians, and has made several international tours promoting knowledge of Aboriginal Australians. He also appears regularly on TV, radio, and film, often speaking on the subject of Aboriginal astronomy. In 2003 he published, with Hugh Cairns, Dark Sparklers, detailing the astronomy embedded in the Wardaman culture. He has been a finalist several times in the National Aboriginal & Torres Strait Islander Art Award. In August 2009 he featured in a two-man The First Astronomers show with astrophysicist Ray Norris at the Darwin Festival, and in November 2009 he was prominent in the Message Stick episode on Aboriginal astronomy produced by ABC TV.

In 2020, the International Astronomical Union's Working Group for Small Body Nomenclature formally approved the asteroid 1979 MR_{2} as 7630 Yidumduma in honour of his sharing and promotion of traditional Wardaman astronomical knowledge through film, television, and books, including Dark Sparkers and Four Circles.

Harney was appointed a Member of the Order of Australia in the 2026 Australia Day Honours.

== Selected bibliography ==
- 1999 - Born Under the Paperbark Tree (with Jan Wositzky) ISBN 1-876622-03-2
- 2003 – Dark Sparklers (with Hugh Cairns) ISBN 0-9750908-0-1

== Oral history interviews ==
Harney was interviewed twice for the Library & Archives NT oral history program:

- Bill Harney Junior, LANT NTRS 226 TS 807 (interviewer Francis Good in September 1987).
- Bill Harney Junior, LANT NTRS 2493 TS 9301 (interviewer Jan Wositsky in July 1993).
