= William Edward Harney =

Australian writer

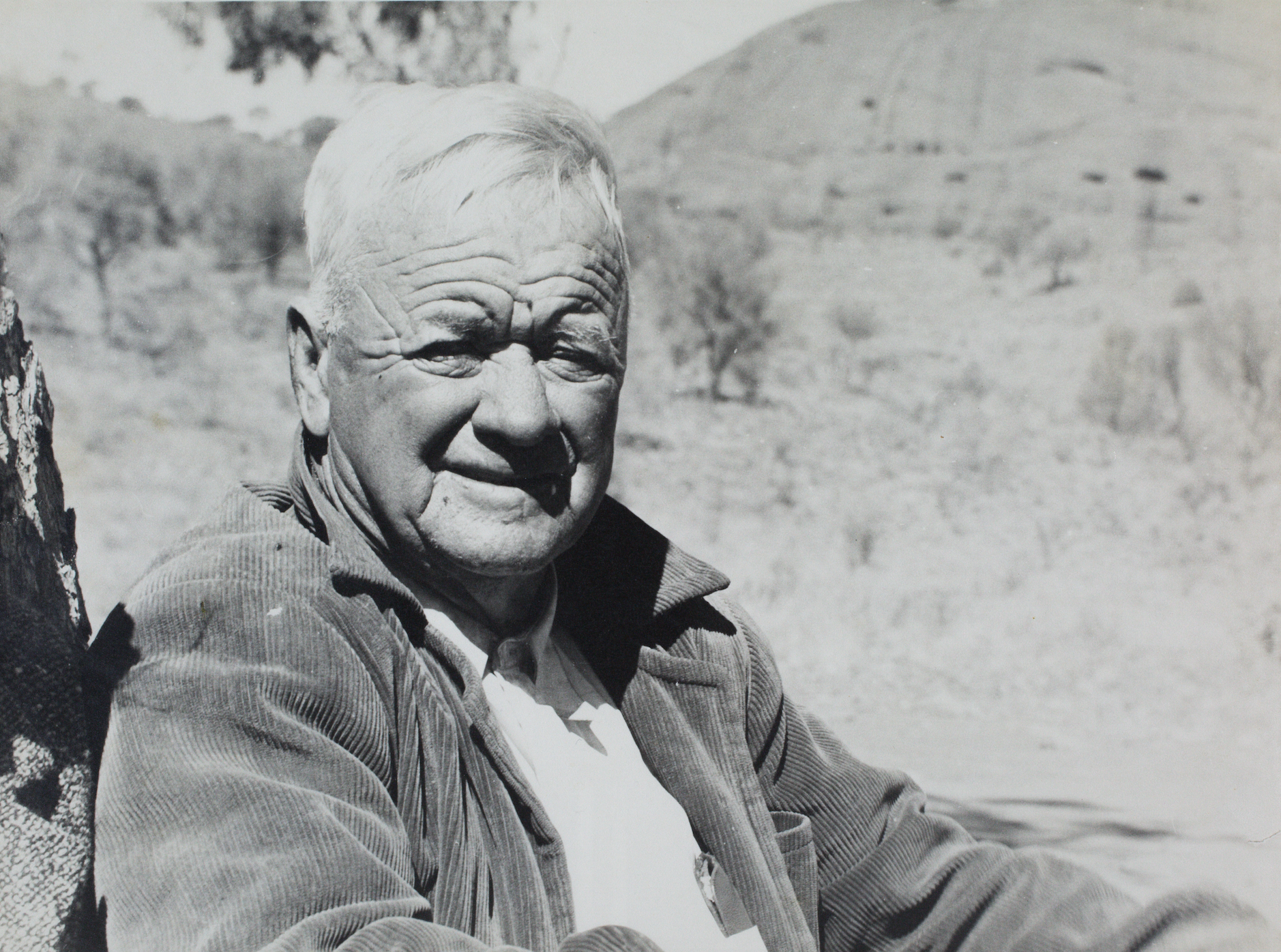
- Bill Harney
- Born: 18 April 1895; Charters Towers, Queensland, Australia
- Died: 31 December 1962 (aged 67); Mooloolaba, Queensland, Australia
- Other name: Bill Harney
- Years active: 1921–1962
- Children: 3

William Edward Harney (18 April 1895 – 31 December 1962), best known as Bill Harney, was an Australian writer. Most of his early life was an itinerant one of poverty and hardship, punctuated by tragedy, spent mainly in the outback. He is notable for his writings about the Aboriginal peoples of Australia's Northern Territory.

== Early life ==
Harney was born in Charters Towers, Queensland, the second of three children of English-born parents. From the age of twelve he was working as a drover and boundary-rider in western Queensland. In 1915 he enlisted in the Australian Imperial Force and, following training in Egypt, served during the First World War on the Western Front in the 9th, later 25th Battalions.

== Work in the Northern Territory ==
In 1921, after Harney won £260.00 on the Melbourne Cup, he leased Seven Emu Station in the Gulf of Carpentaria. He worked with the local Garrwa people to develop the cattle station. He was caught with two thousand cattle stolen from Cresswell Station and was incarcerated in the Borroloola jail. While awaiting his trial, Harney learned to appreciate the Classics, finding among the remnants of the town's Carnegie Library the works of Sue, Shakespeare and Plutarch.

After six months, Harney was released without conviction, and became a trepanger, fishing for sea cucumber. He worked closely with the local Yanyuwa people who traded trepang with the Macassans for 300 years prior.

From 1940 to 1947 Harney worked for the Australian government’s Native Affairs Branch as a Protector of Aborigines and as a patrol officer. Subsequently, he concentrated on writing as well as acting as an adviser on expeditions by the National Geographic Society to Arnhem Land and Melville Island. Between 1941 and 1957 he wrote numerous articles for Walkabout in which he was remembered as a colourful contributor. He was also an adviser during the making of the film Jedda (1955).

He was appointed the first ranger of Ayer's Rock (now Uluru) in 1959, a job he held until he retired in 1962. Harney moved to Queensland and died the same year at his home in Mooloolaba. He is commemorated in the scientific name of the sandstone dibbler, Pseudantechinus bilarni, which reflects the Aboriginal pronunciation of his name.

== Personal life ==
On 5 April 1927 Harney married Linda Beattie, known as Linda, a Warumungu woman while on Groote Eylandt. Together they had two children; Beatrice (Beattie) in 1928 and Billy in 1930. Linda died from tuberculosis in 1932 as later did their daughter Beattie in 1934. Their son Billy drowned at Alice Springs in 1945 while trying to save a friend.

Harney was ostracised by white society for 'marrying into the colour' and later, after Linda died, her family blamed Bill for her sickness and for 'taking her out of her country'. He coined a term for his own experience as 'the race trap'.

In 1931 Harney had a son, Bill Yidumduma Harney with Wardaman woman Ludi Libuluyma.

== Bibliography ==
As well as many articles in popular magazines, books written or co-written by Harney include:

- 1943 – Taboo
- 1946 - North of 23
- 1948 - The Brimming Billabong
- 1949 – Songs of the Songmen (with A. P. Elkin)
- 1957 – Life Among the Aborigines
- 1958 – Content to Lie in the Sun
- 1960 – Bill Harney's Cook Book (with Patricia Thompson)
- 1961 – Grief, Gaiety and Aborigines
- 1963 - To Ayers Rock and Beyond
- 1963 – The Shady Tree (completed by Douglas Lockwood)
- 1983 – Bill Harney's War. Currey O'Neil: Melbourne. ISBN 0-85902-137-8
- 1990 – A Bushman's Life (edited by Douglas and Ruth Lockwood). Viking O'Neil: ISBN 0-670-90295-0

== See also ==
- Australian outback literature of the 20th century
