= Odd radio circle =

Unexplained circular astronomical object detected only by radio waves

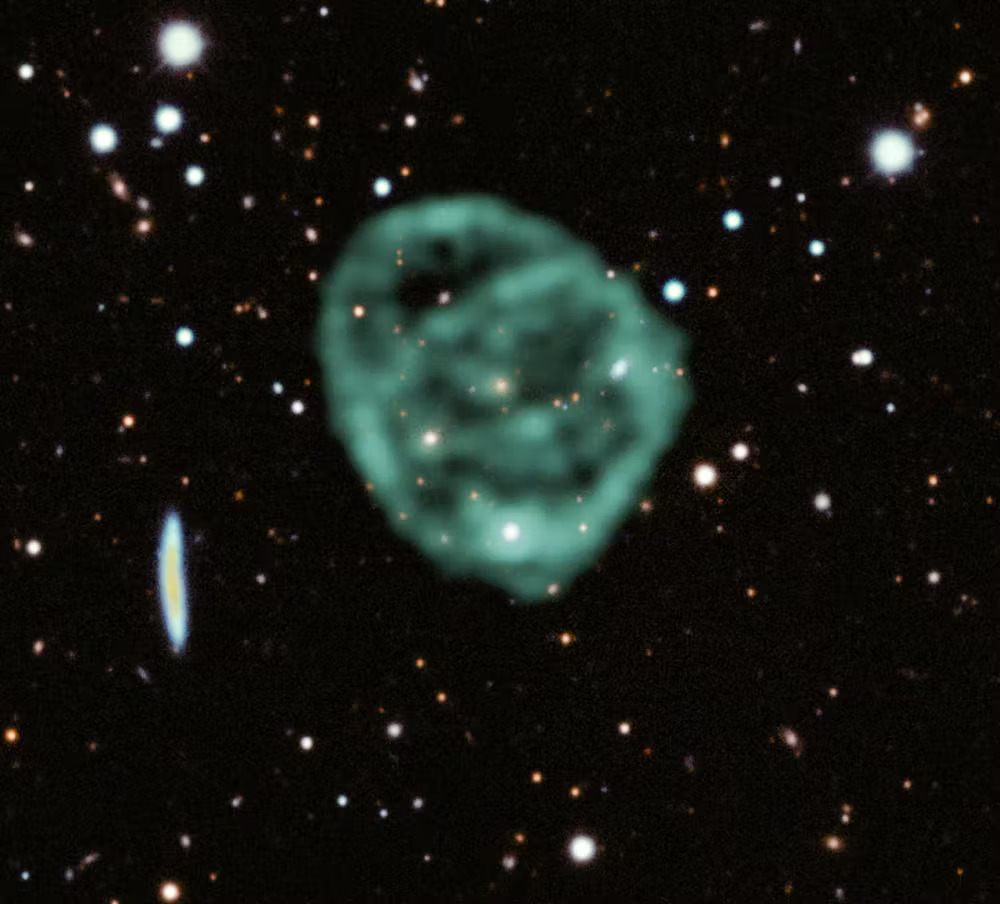
Image of Odd radio circle ORC J2103-6200 by the MeerKAT telescope superimposed on an optical image from the Dark Energy Survey (2022)

In astronomy, an odd radio circle (ORC) is a very large (over 50 times the diameter of our Milky Way ~ 3 million light years) unexplained astronomical object that, at radio wavelengths, is highly circular and brighter along its edges. As of October 2025, there have been 8 such objects (and possibly six more) observed. The observed ORCs are bright at radio wavelengths, but are not visible at visible, infrared or X-ray wavelengths. This is due to the physical process producing this radiation, which is thought to be synchrotron radiation. Three of the ORCs contain optical galaxies in their centers, suggesting that the galaxies might have formed these objects. Only in three cases twin intersecting rings have been seen and they are ORC J2103-6200, ORC J0356-4216 and RAD J131346.9+500320. The last one, RAD J131346.9+500320, discovered by the RAD@home citizen scientists using LOFAR data is currently the farthest and most powerful ORC discovered.

== Description ==
Artist’s impression of an odd radio circle exploding from a central galaxy. ORCs can expand past other galaxies.

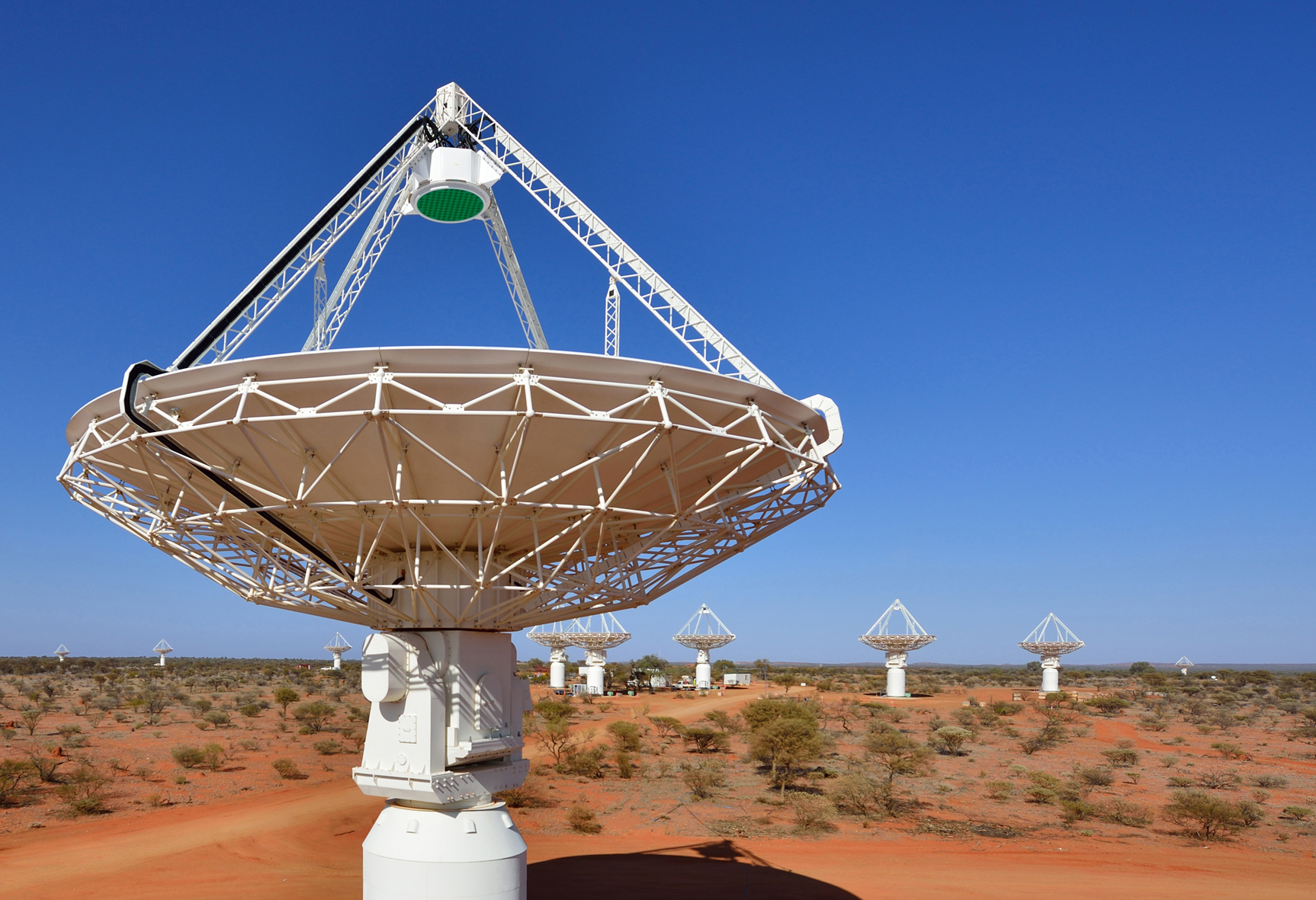
Australian Square Kilometre Array Pathfinder (ASKAP) radio telescope array

The ORCs were detected in late 2019 after astronomer Anna Kapinska studied a Pilot Survey of the Evolutionary Map of the Universe (EMU), based on the Australian Square Kilometre Array Pathfinder (ASKAP) radio telescope array. All of the ORCs are about 1 arcminute in diameter, and are some distance from the galactic plane, at high galactic latitudes.

The possibility of a spherical shock wave, associated with fast radio bursts, gamma-ray bursts, or neutron star mergers, was considered, but, if related, would have to have taken place in the distant past due to the large angular size of the ORCs, according to the researchers. Also, according to the astronomers, "Circular features are well-known in radio astronomical images, and usually represent a spherical object such as a supernova remnant, a planetary nebula, a circumstellar shell, or a face-on disc such as a protoplanetary disc or a star-forming galaxy, ... They may also arise from imaging artefact around bright sources caused by calibration errors or inadequate deconvolution. This class of circular feature in radio images does not seem to correspond to any of these known types of object or artefact, but rather appears to be a new class of astronomical object."

== See also ==
- Fast radio burst
- Gamma-ray burst
- Radio lobes of radio galaxies
- Gravitational wave
- Baryon acoustic oscillations
