= Australian Square Kilometre Array Pathfinder =

Radio telescope in Western Australia

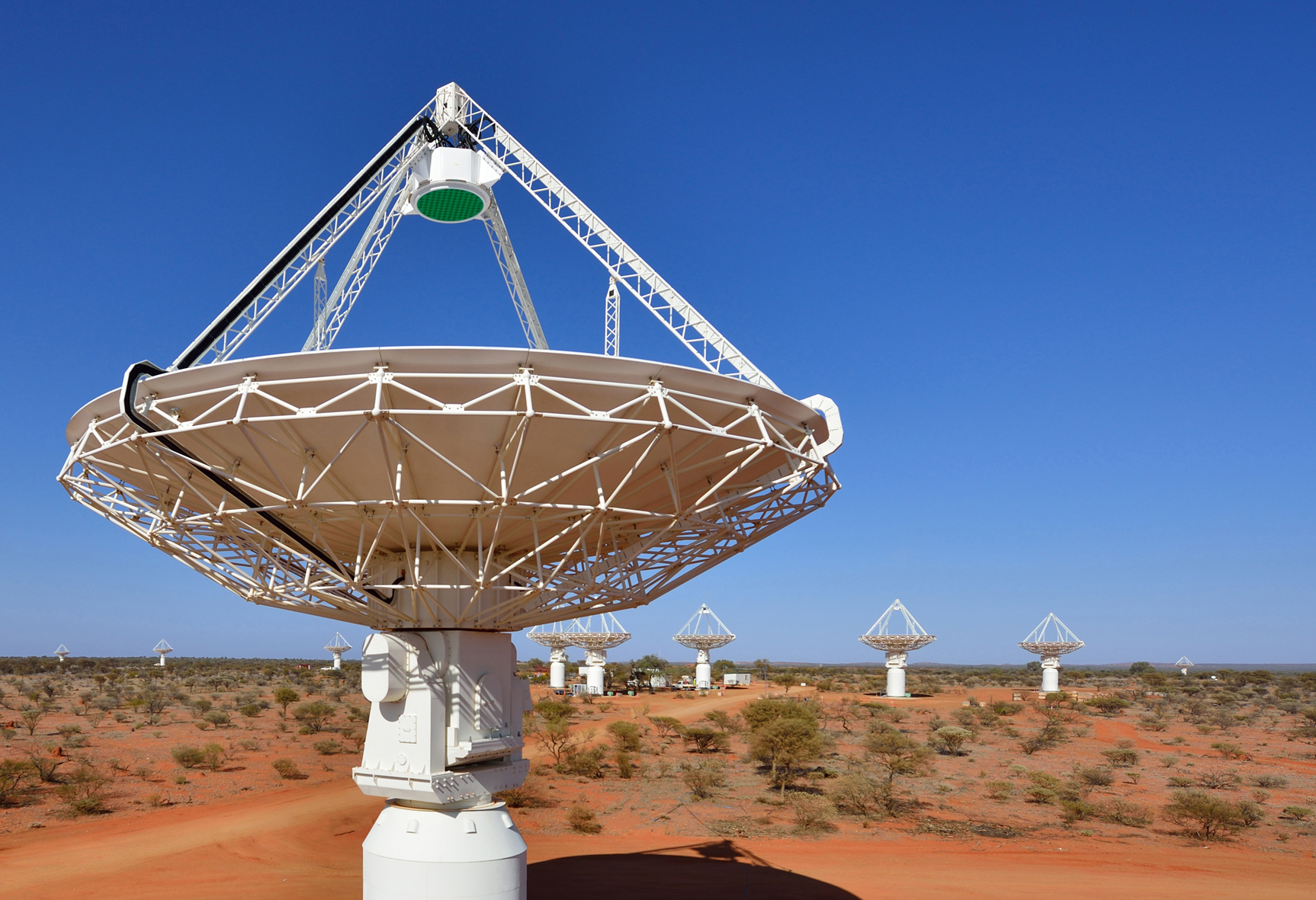
- Antennas of the ASKAP telescope at the Murchison Radio-astronomy Observatory in Western Australia
- Location: Western Australia, AUS
- Coordinates: 26°41′46″S 116°38′13″E
- Website: www.atnf.csiro.au/projects/askap/,%20https://www.csiro.au/askap
- Location within Australia
- Related media on Commons

The ASKAP radio telescope is a radio telescope array located at Inyarrimanha Ilgari Bundara, the CSIRO Murchison Radio-astronomy Observatory in the Mid West region of Western Australia. Construction started in 2009 and was completed in 2019, when the major Survey Science projects started. The Survey Science Projects are expected to be completed by 2030.

The facility began as a technology demonstrator for the international Square Kilometre Array (SKA), an internationally planned radio telescope which will be larger and more sensitive. The ASKAP site has been selected as one of the SKA's two central locations.

It is operated by the Commonwealth Scientific and Industrial Research Organisation (CSIRO) and forms part of the Australia Telescope National Facility. Construction commenced in late 2009 and first light was in October 2012.

ASKAP consists of 36 identical parabolic antennas, each 12 m (39 ft) in diameter, working together as a single astronomical interferometer with a total collecting area of approximately 4,000 m^{2} (43,000 sq ft). Each antenna is equipped with a phased-array feed (PAF), significantly increasing the field of view. This design provides both fast survey speed and high sensitivity.

ASKAP observes three classes of projects:

1. Survey Science Projects, for which the telescope was primarily designed. These occupy at least 75% of the observing time
2. Observatory projects which are projects run by the observatory for the benefit of the broader community. All data from these are made publicly available without any proprietary period.
3. Guest Science projects, which are proposed by users through the normal Australia Telescope National Facility proposal process

== Description ==
Development and construction of ASKAP was led by CSIRO Space and Astronomy, in collaboration with scientists and engineers in the Netherlands, Canada, and the US, as well as colleagues from Australian universities and industry partners in China.

== Design ==
External videos
- Watch a video of the first ASKAP antenna construction at the MRO in January 2010.

The construction and assembly of the dishes was completed in June 2012.

ASKAP was designed as a synoptic telescope with a wide field-of-view, large spectral bandwidth, fast survey speed, and a large number of simultaneous baselines. The greatest technical challenge was the design and construction of the phased array feeds, which had not previously been used for radio astronomy, and so presented many new technical challenges, as well as the largest data rate so far encountered in a radio telescope.

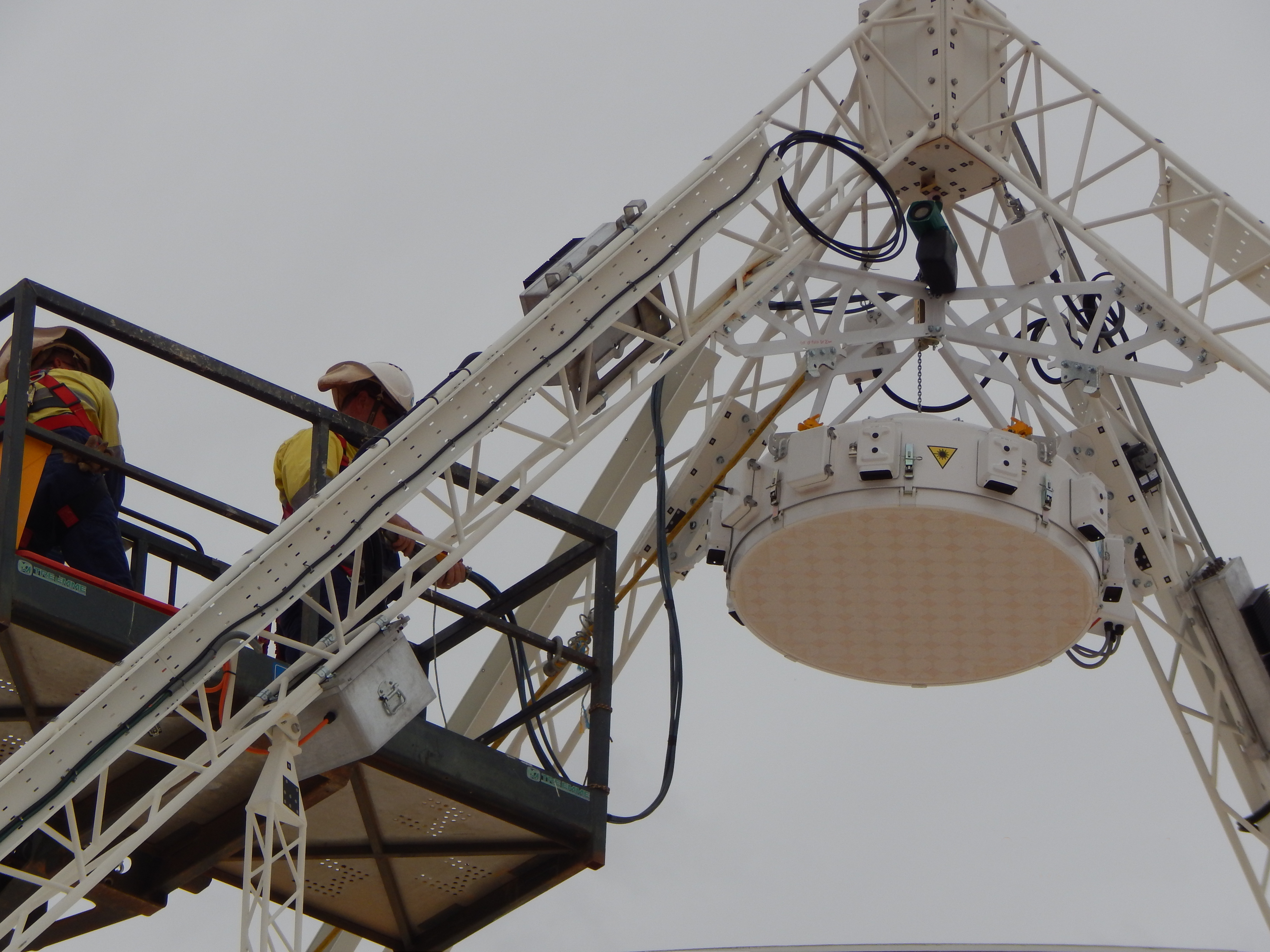
Installation of an advanced Phased Array Feed (PAF) receiver on an ASKAP antenna. This feed includes 188 individual receivers, to greatly extend the Field of View of an ASKAP 12m dish to 30 square degrees.

ASKAP is located in the Murchison district in Western Australia, a region that is extremely "radio-quiet" due to the low population density and resulting lack of radio interference (generated by human activity) that would otherwise interfere with weak astronomical signals. The radio quiet location is recognised as a natural resource and protected by the Australian Commonwealth and Western Australia State Government through a range of regulatory measures.

Data from ASKAP are transmitted from the observatory to a supercomputer (acting as a radio correlator) at the Pawsey Supercomputing Research Centre in Perth. The data are processed in near-real-time by a pipeline processor running purpose-built software. All data are made publicly available after quality checks by the ten ASKAP Survey Science Teams.

== Survey science projects ==
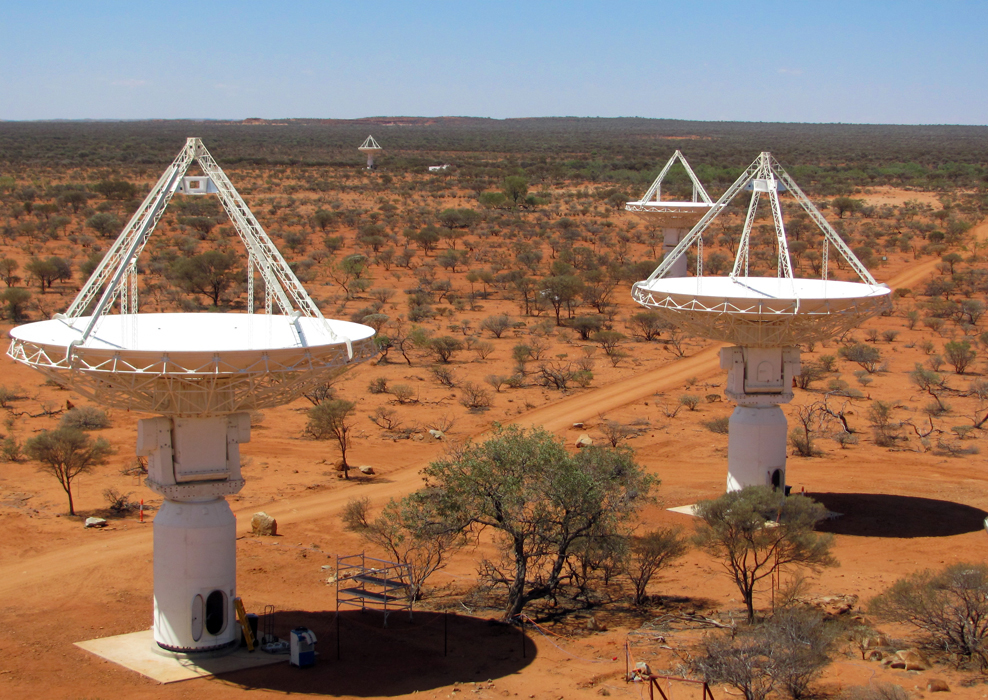
The array in 2010

During ASKAP's full operation, at least 75% of its observing time are used for large Survey Science Projects ASKAP is intended to study the following topics:

1. Galaxy formation and gas evolution in the nearby Universe through extragalactic HI surveys
2. Evolution, formation and population of galaxies across cosmic time via high resolution, continuum surveys
3. Characterisation of the radio transient sky through detection and monitoring (including VLBI) of transient and variable sources, and
4. Evolution of magnetic fields in galaxies over cosmic time through polarisation surveys.

Eight (initially ten) ASKAP Survey Science Projects were selected to be the main focus of the observing, and they occupy at least 75% of the observing time. They are:

=== Highest priority ===
- EMU: Evolutionary Map of the Universe
- WALLABY: Widefield ASKAP L-Band Legacy All-Sky Blind Survey

=== Lower priority ===
- CRAFT: The Commensal Real-time ASKAP Fast Transients survey
- DINGO: Deep Investigations of Neutral Gas Origins
- FLASH: The First Large Absorption Survey in HI
- GASKAP: The Galactic ASKAP Spectral Line Survey
- POSSUM: Polarization Sky Survey of the Universe's Magnetism
- VAST: An ASKAP Survey for Variables and Slow Transients

== Observatory Projects ==
=== Rapid ASKAP Continuum Survey (RACS) ===
From 2019 onwards, ASKAP conducted a rapid survey of the entire sky up to declination +40°, to provide a shallow model of the radio sky to aid the calibration of subsequent deep ASKAP surveys, as well as providing a valuable resource to astronomers. With a typical rms sensitivity of 0.2-0.4 mJy/beam and a typical spatial resolution of 15-25 arcsec, RACS is significantly deeper, and higher resolution, than comparable radio surveys such as NVSS and SUMMS, but shallower than EMU which will take longer to complete. All the resulting data, including images, catalogues, and calibrated visibilities, are placed in the public domain.

The survey initially mapped three million galaxies in 300 hours, a million of which are new.

RACS consists of three sub-projects:

1. RACS-low, centred on 887.5 MHz, with a resolution of about 18 * 12 arcsec.
2. RACS-mid, centred on 1367.5 MHz, with a resolution of about 10 * 8 arcsec.
3. RACS-high, centred on 1655.5 MHz, with a resolution of about 9 * 6 arcsec.

=== Low Time Resolution Universe Survey (LOTRUN) ===
LOTRUN is an observatory-led project to use the ASKAP CRACO high-time resolution facility to search for time-variable radio sources. It will probe the Galactic radio sky at sub-second timescales. As an observatory-led project, all data will be placed in the public domain as soon as it is processed and validated. The CRAFT and VAST science survey projects also probe the time-variable radio sky, but on a different timescale, so that LOTRUN occupies a hitherto untargeted part of parameter space. The goal of LOTRUN is to repeatedly observe several tracks towards the inner Galactic plane, spending several hours on each track. This will provide an unbiased survey for studies such as long-period transient searches.

== Construction and operational phases ==
=== Construction ===
Construction of ASKAP started in 2009.

=== Boolardy Engineering Test Array ===
Once six antennas were completed and equipped with phased-array feeds, and backend electronics, the array was named the Boolardy Engineering Test Array (BETA). BETA operated from March 2014 to February 2016. It was the first aperture synthesis radio telescope to use phased array feed technology, enabling the formation of up to nine dual-polarisation beams. A series of astronomical observations were made with BETA to test the operation of the phased array feeds, and to help the commissioning and operation of the final ASKAP telescope.

=== Design enhancement ===
The first prototype phased-array feeds (PAF) proved the concept worked, but their performance was not optimal. In 2013–2014, while the BETA array was operational, significant sections of ASKAP were redesigned to improve performance in a process known as the ASKAP design enhancement (ADE). The main changes were:

1. Improve the receiver design to provide a lower system temperature that would be roughly constant across the bandwidth of the receivers
2. Replace the FPGA chips in the digital processor to faster chips with lower power consumption
3. Replace the water cooling system in the PAF by a more reliable Peltier temperature stabilisation system
4. Replace the coaxial signal transmission between the antennas and the central site by a system in which the radio frequency signals were directly modulated onto optical signals to be transmitted over optical fibre
5. Replace the complex radio-frequency signal conversion system by a direct sampling system

Although the ADE delayed the completion of ASKAP, this was felt to be justified as the resulting system had better performance, was lower cost, and more reliable. The first ADE PAF was installed in August 2014. By April 2016, nine ADE PAFs were installed, together with the new ADE correlator, and more PAFs were progressively installed on the remaining antennas over the next few years.

=== Early science ===
From 2015 until 2019, a series of ASKAP Early Science Projects were observed on behalf of the astronomical community, across all areas of astrophysics, with the primary goals of demonstrating the capabilities of ASKAP, providing data to the astronomy community to facilitate development of techniques, and evaluating the performance and characteristics of the system. The early science program resulted in several science papers published in peer-reviewed journals, as well as helping to commission the instrument, and guiding the planning of the main survey projects.

=== Pilot surveys ===
Each of the ten Science Survey projects were invited to submit a proposal for a pilot survey to test observing strategies. These pilot survey observations took place in 2019-2020 and have resulted in significant astrophysical results, including the discovery of Odd Radio Circles.

=== Full survey operations ===
The ten Science Survey projects started observing in 2020, and are expected to be complete by 2030.

=== Discoveries ===
In May 2020, astronomers announced a measurement of the intergalactic medium using six fast radio bursts observed with ASKAP; their results confirm existing measurements of the missing baryon problem.

In 2021, during the ASKAP EMU Pilot Survey, a new class of astronomical object called Odd radio circles (ORCs) were discovered at ASKAP.

== See also ==
- List of radio telescopes
- AARNet
- LOFAR
- MeerKAT
