= Large Latin American Millimeter Array =

Astronomical radio observatory

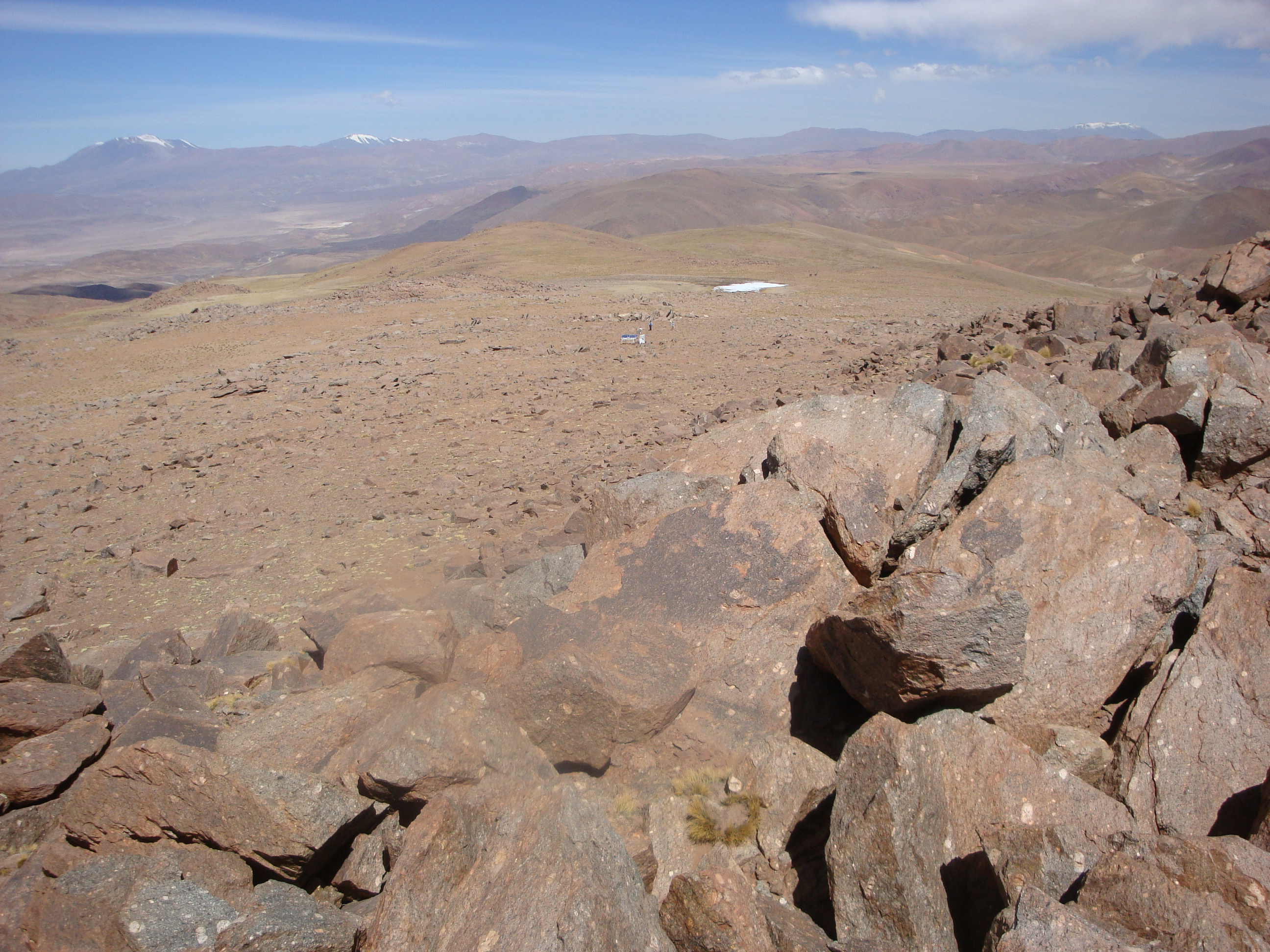
- The site for the LLAMA telescope
- Alternative names: LLAMA
- Location: Puna de Atacama, San Antonio de los Cobres, Argentina
- Coordinates: 24°11′31″S 66°28′29″W
- Organization: Argentine Institute of Radio Astronomy; University of São Paulo
- Altitude: 4,820 m (15,810 ft)
- Wavelength: 35, 1,000 GHz (8.57, 0.30 mm)
- Telescope style: Cassegrain reflector radio telescope
- Diameter: 12 m (39 ft 4 in)
- Focal length: 4.8 m (15 ft 9 in)
- Website: www.llamaobservatory.org
- Location within Argentina
- Related media on Commons

The Large Latin American Millimeter Array (LLAMA) is a single-dish 12 m Nasmyth optics antenna under construction in the Puna de Atacama desert in the Province of Salta, Argentina, next to the Qubic experiment. The primary mirror accuracy will allow observation from 40 GHz up to 900 GHz. After installation it will be able to join other similar instruments to perform Very Large Base Line Interferometry or to work in standalone mode. Financial support is provided by the Argentinian and Brazilian governments. The total cost of construction, around US$20 million, and operation as well as the telescope time use will be shared equally by the two countries. Construction planning started in July 2014 after the formal signature of an agreement between the main institutions involved.

== Overview ==
LLAMA is a joint project between Argentinian and Brazilian Astronomers to build and operate a radio telescope at submillimeter wavelengths, that can work in stand alone mode or join a Very Long Baseline Interferometry (VLBI) network. The main scientific institutions involved in the project are the Argentine Institute of Radio Astronomy (IAR), and the Núcleo para o Apoio da Rádio Astronomia (NARA), from the Universidade de São Paulo (Brazil). The telescope is located at a very high altitude (4,825 m) where the atmospheric absorption (mostly due to water vapor) allows the observation at the very short wavelengths of less than 1 mm. It is a multipurpose instrument that will have cryogenic receivers with very high sensitivity in order to observe very faint sources, and filters to observe the Sun.

== History ==
The history of the instrument can be traced back to 2007, during the XII Latin American Regional IAU Meeting (LARIM) held in Isla de Margarita (Venezuela). Argentinian radio astronomers discussed the idea with colleagues from South America. The search for the best place for a submillimeter (wavelength less than 1 mm) telescope had started in Argentina in 2003, with a 210 GHz tipper which was installed in different places to investigate the atmospheric opacity. During the XXVII General Assembly in Rio de Janeiro, the project gained a name in a document authored by the leading scientists of the project. In the same document, scientists also proposed the initial science, budget, strategies for construction, site, and other matters. The formal presentation before the Argentinian Science Ministry (MinCyT) was in 2010, while a meeting held at the offices of FAPESP in August 2011 was the kickoff in Brazil. In 2011, MinCyT ranked LLAMA as its astronomical project and in 2012, FAPESP approved a €7 M grant. The final agreement, between MinCyT, FAPESP and Universidade de São Paulo (USP), was signed in June 2014, and on July 9, it was formally presented to the public.

Measurements of the electrical characteristics of the site were carried out in late 2016, and construction of the road to the summit began in December 2016. Assembly of the antenna is planned to take place in 2022, with testing beginning in 2023.

== Origin of the name ==
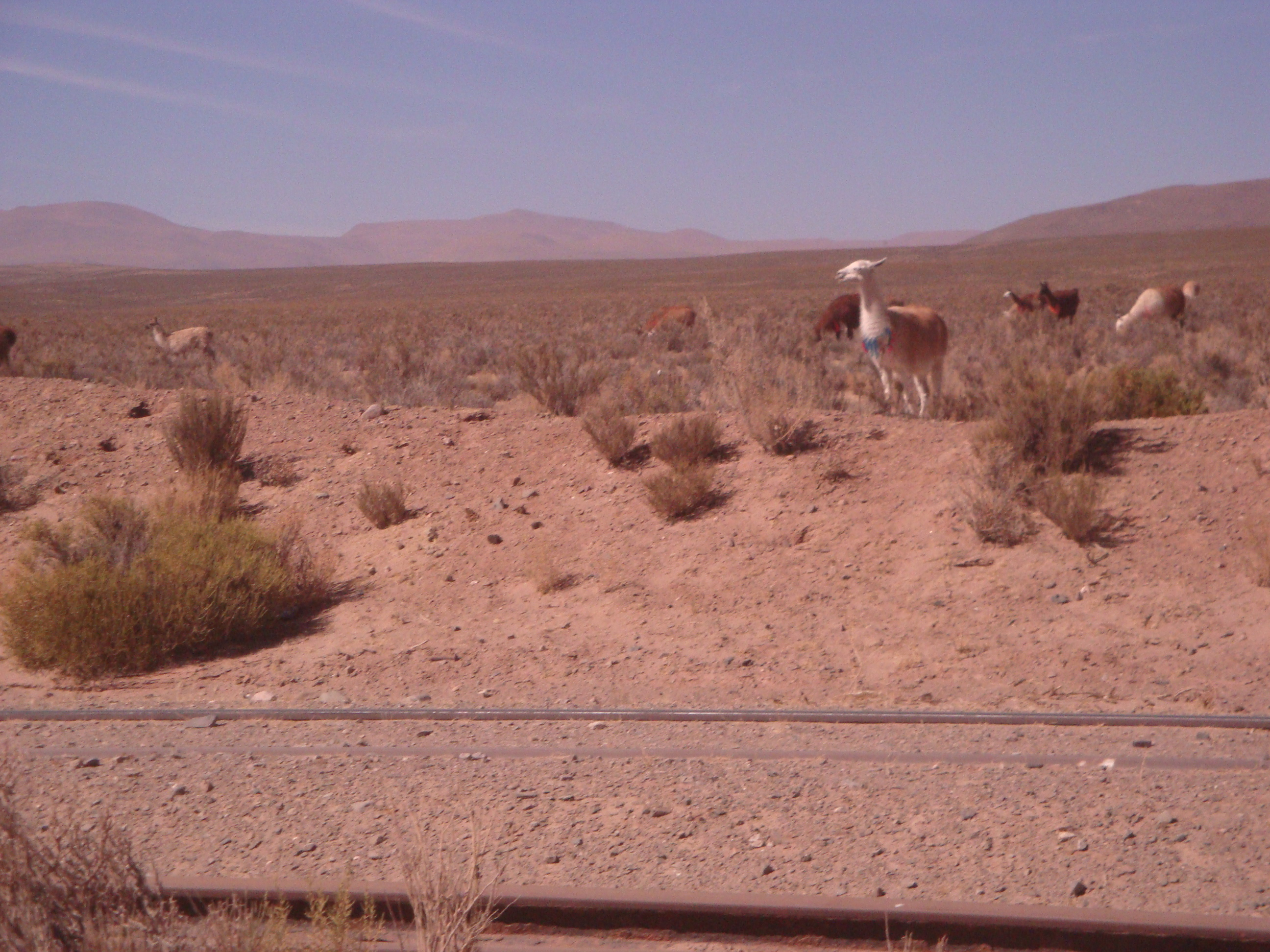
A group of llamas near San Antonio de los Cobres shot from a car in movement.

The observatory acronym comes from the Quechuan word llama that designates the South American camelid that lives in the region where the telescope is being installed. There is some confusion with the word array, since LLAMA will consist of a single dish antenna, but the instrument will have VLBI technology and can therefore be part of an antenna array with telescopes of other observatories. Moreover, the LLAMA observatory can be expanded in the future by installing other antennas in different sites.

In different official documents the acronym LLAMA may be found expanded as Long Latin American Millimeter Array rather than Large. It is also possible to read Millimetric instead of Millimeter. After some debate, the LLAMA Executive Committee stated that Large Latin American Millimeter Array is the right expansion for the LLAMA acronym.

The observatory logo has as symbols the Southern Cross (upper right), a telescope sketch (bottom right), the acronym (upper left) and a llama profile (bottom left). Although it changed with time, these symbols are present since the beginning. The image illustrating this page is the official logo since August 2014.

== Science ==
LLAMA is a multipurpose instrument, with the capacity to both observe bright sources like the Sun, and very weak sources very far from Earth. The following is a list of different subjects that will be addressed with LLAMA observations.

=== The Sun ===
In the unperturbed solar atmosphere, the shorter the wavelength the deeper the observation. Frequencies near the submillimeter range are produced in the lower chromosphere or the photosphere. Therefore, LLAMA observations will bring new information about the structure of the lower Solar Atmosphere, the active and quiescent filaments and the dynamics of the chromosphere and its magnetic field. The possibility to observe Solar Flares at high frequencies with a high sensitive instrument will give clues about the acceleration of the high energetic particles in the Sun, complementing results obtained with the Solar Submillimeter Telescope. In particular the still unexplained spectral inversion above ≈ 100 GHz. A possible experiment would be to make VLBI solar observations. For example, in a joint observation between LLAMA and some of the ALMA antennas, a spatial resolution of 0.001" would be achieved for λ ≈ 1 mm, corresponding to a distance of 700 m on the solar surface.

=== Planets ===
- Extra-solar planetary systems around stars near the Sun.
- Proto-planetary disks in star located in the Solar neighborhood.
- Near-Earth objects.

=== Stellar objects ===
- Star forming regions, young stellar objects, and mechanisms of the star formation.
- Non-thermal processes in stellar magnetospheres.
- Interaction of stars and remnants of supernova with the interstellar medium.

=== Astrophysical jets and maser emission ===
- Astrophysical jets.
- Maser phenomena of the recombination lines of the hydrogen atom.
- Maser emission in star-forming regions.
- Maser emission in late stars stellar envelopes.

=== Galactic and Intergalactic interstellar medium ===
- Continuum radiation from extragalactic cold dust.
- Molecular material in the direction of different stellar objects.
- Intergalactic Medium using the detection of molecular absorption lines in the direction of quasars.
- Cosmic background radiation.

=== Galaxies ===
- Search for CO in galaxies with high redshift.
- Molecular abundance.
- Active Galactic Nuclei (AGN).
- Variation of the fundamental constants by the observation of gravitational lensing.
- High redshifts of regions with very high rate of star formation.
- Proto-clusters of galaxies.
- Space-time distortion produced by massive black holes.

== Optics, Receivers ==
The Nasmyth optics will allow the installation of up to as six different heterodyne receivers. There is a consensus for these receivers to use the same spectral bands as ALMA. With this scheme the Nasmyth cabins will allocate receivers for the bands

#	Frequency Band [GHz]	Wavelength Band [mm]
1	35 - 50	8.6 - 6.0
3	84 - 116	3.6 - 2.6
5	162 - 211	1.9 - 1.4
6	211 - 275	1.4 - 1.1
7	275 - 373	1.1 - 0.8
9	602 - 720	0.5 - 0.4

It is intended to install a bolometer multi-wavelength camera at the Cassegrain focus, or possibly a camera plus a small heterodyne array.

== See also ==
- Atacama Large Millimeter Array, the biggest millimeter array ever built.
- Atacama Pathfinder Experiment (APEX), single dish sub-millimetre telescope built on a modified ALMA prototype antenna
- Atacama Submillimeter Telescope Experiment
- CARMA a sensitive millimetre-wave array operated by a consortium including Caltech, University of California Berkeley, University of Illinois, University of Maryland and University of Chicago
- Cosmic Background Imager a 13 element interferometer operating in Llano de Chajnantor since 1999.
- IRAM 30 Meter Telescope (Pico Veleta, Spain), the largest millimetric telescope in the world, operated by IRAM
- James Clerk Maxwell Telescope The most sensitive existing sub-millimetre telescope
- Plateau de Bure Interferometer, one of the most successful existing millimetre-wave arrays, operated by IRAM
- Solar Submillimeter Telescope, the unique solar dedicated submillimeter instrument
- List of radio telescopes
- List of observatories
