= Scientific philosophy =

Scientific philosophy may refer to:

- Logical positivism
- Experimental philosophy
- Scientific philosophy (metaphilosophy)

For philosophical issues raised by science, see philosophy of science.
