= Northern Extended Millimeter Array =

Radio telescope

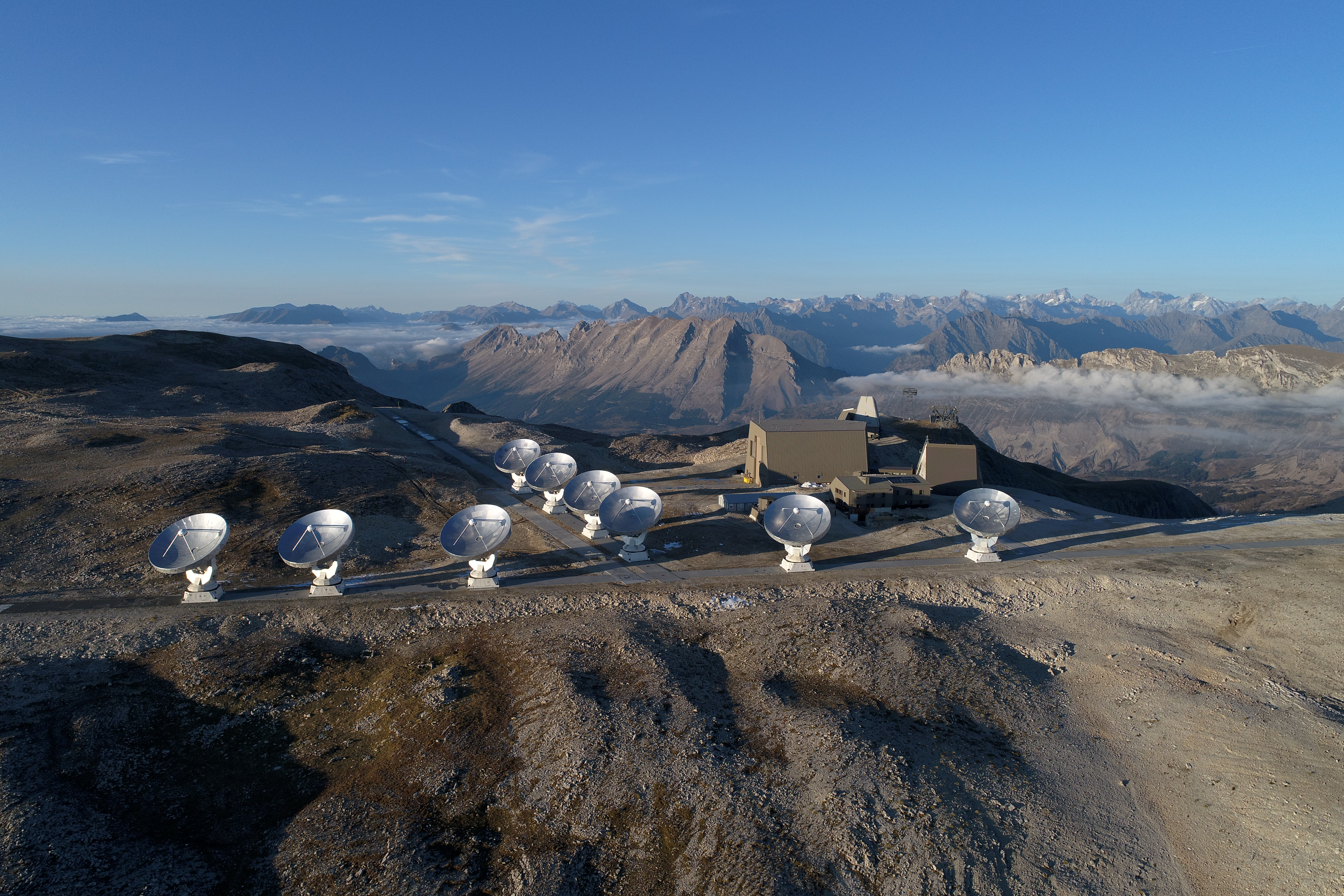
- NOEMA Observatory
- Alternative names: NOEMA
- Location: Plateau de Bure, Montmaur, arrondissement of Gap, Hautes-Alpes, Provence-Alpes-Côte d'Azur, metropolitan France, France
- Coordinates: 44°38′02″N 5°54′29″E
- Altitude: 2,552 m (8,373 ft)
- Replaced: Plateau de Bure Interferometer
- Website: iram-institute.org/observatories/noema/
- Location within France

The Northern Extended Millimeter Array (NOEMA) is one of the largest astronomical facilities on European ground and the most powerful radio telescope in the Northern Hemisphere operating at millimeter wavelengths. It consists of a large array of twelve 15-meter antennas that can spread over distances of up to 1.7 kilometers, working together as a single telescope.

NOEMA is the successor of the Plateau de Bure Interferometer and is run by the international research institute IRAM (Institut de radioastronomie millimétrique).

The observatory operates at over 2500 meters above sea level on one of the most extended European high altitude sites, the Plateau de Bure in the French Alps. Together with IRAM's other observatory, the IRAM 30-meter telescope, it is part of the global Event Horizon Telescope array.

== Operation ==
Instead of operating one giant telescope, NOEMA relies on several smaller and easily movable antennas placed on tracks. Together, the NOEMA antennas have the resolving power of a telescope with a diameter of more than 1.7 kilometers, which is the distance between the outermost antennas.

During observations, the NOEMA antennas function as a single stationary telescope, a technique called interferometry. All NOEMA antennas point towards the same cosmic source. The signals received by each antenna are combined by a supercomputer, a so-called correlator, that produces images of outstanding sensitivity and resolution of the astronomical source.

NOEMA functions like a variable-lens camera by changing the configuration of its antennas, allowing scientists to zoom in and out of a cosmic object and observe the tiniest details. In its most extended configuration, NOEMA shows a 0.1 arc second view at 350 GHz, revealing the nature of the nearest protostellar disks and the sub-kiloparsec scale of star-forming regions of the most distant galaxies. Working with IRAM's second facility, the 30-meter telescope and its wide angle of vision, the result is a giant virtual telescope with a unique set of capabilities.

== Science ==
Compared to optical astronomy, which is sensitive to the hot universe (stars are generally a few thousand degrees Celsius), radiotelescopes that operate in the millimeter wavebands, such as NOEMA, probe the cold universe (around –250 degrees Celsius). NOEMA is able to see the formation of the first galaxies in the universe, to observe supermassive black holes at the center of galaxies, to analyze the chemical evolution and dynamics of nearby galaxies, to detect organic molecules and possible key elements of life, and to investigate the formation of stars and the appearance of planetary systems.

NOEMA has done pioneering work in radio astronomy. It observed the most distant galaxy known at the time of observation. (Since then, the James Webb Space Telescope has observed more distant galaxies.) Together with the IRAM 30-meter telescope, it made the first complete and detailed radio images of nearby galaxies and their gas. NOEMA also obtained the first image of a gas disk surrounding a double star system (Dutrey al. 1994). Its antennas captured for the first time a cavity in one of these disks, a major hint for the existence of a planetary object orbiting the new star and absorbing matter on its trajectory (GG Tau, Piétu et al. 2011 ). Together, the IRAM facilities have discovered one third of the interstellar molecules known to date (published ApJ, 2018, Brett A. McGuire).

== Gallery ==
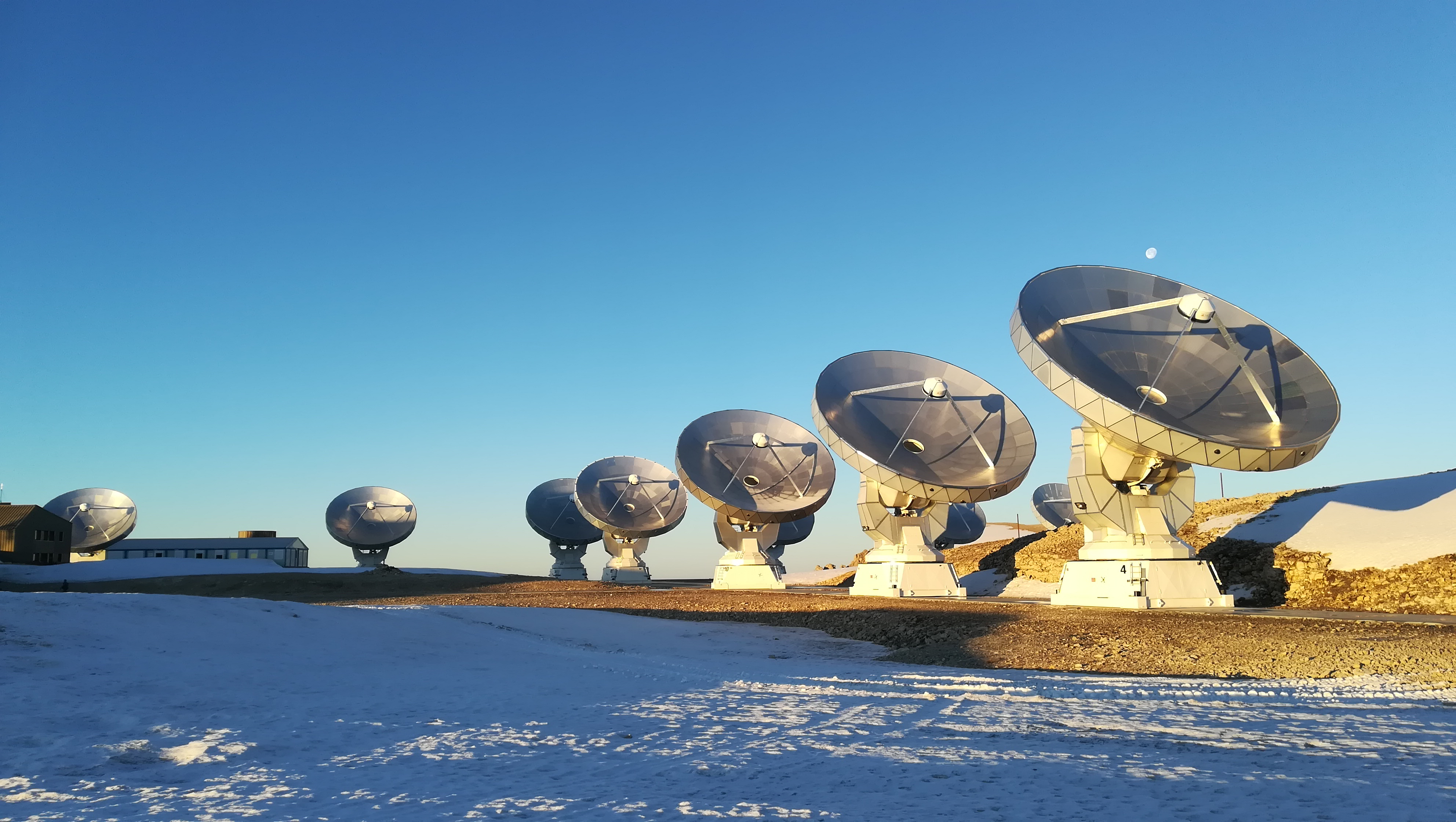
The NOEMA observatory

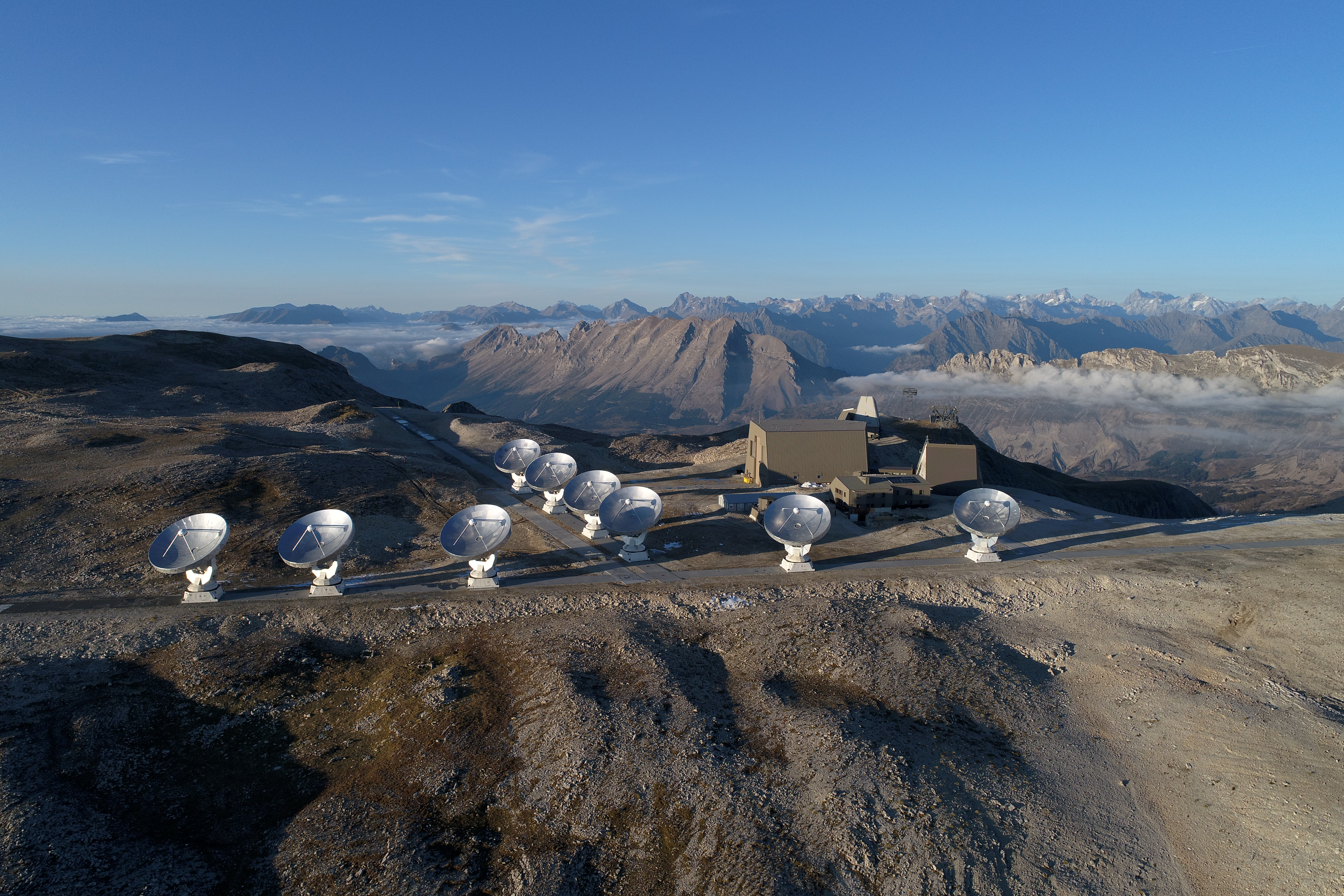
The NOEMA observatory, located on the Plateau de Bure in the French Alps

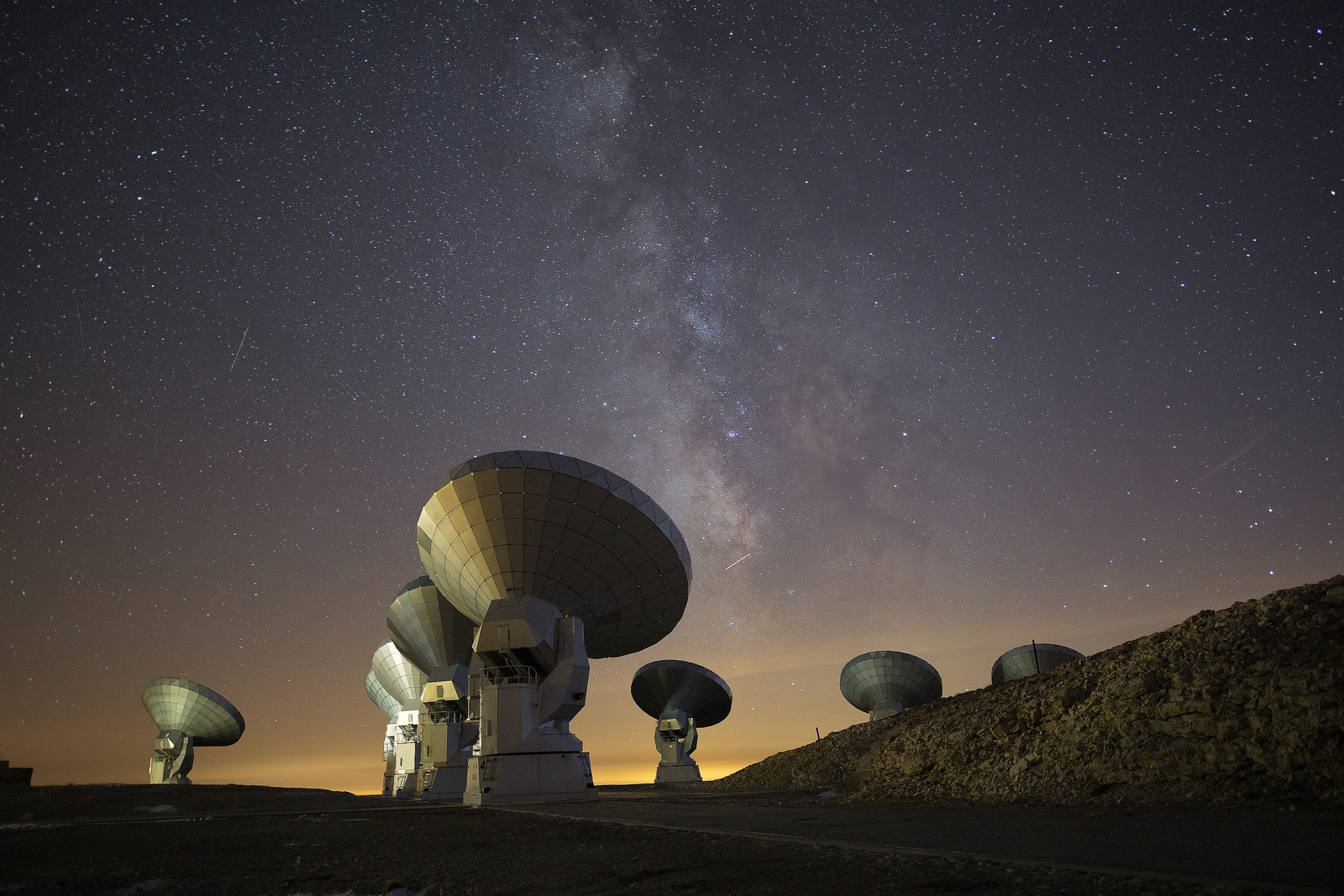
The NOEMA antennas looking at the night sky

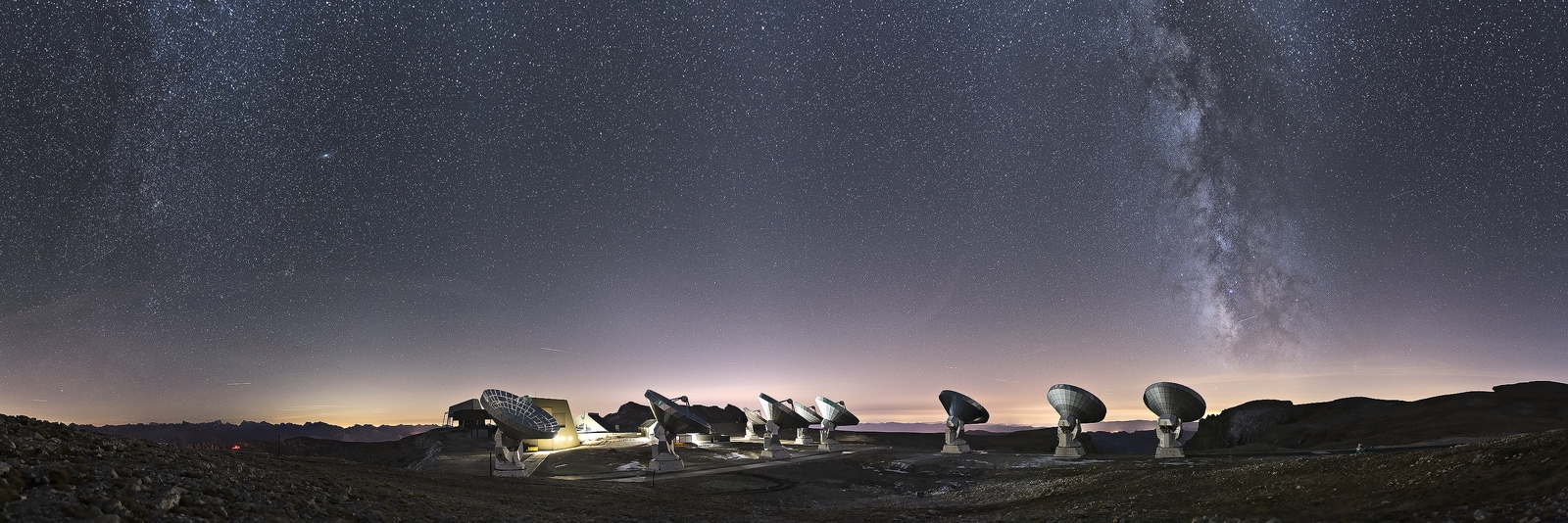
The NOEMA observatory looking at the night sky with the Milky Way

== See also ==
- List of radio telescopes
