= Gustavo E. Romero =

Argentine astrophysicist

Gustavo Esteban Romero
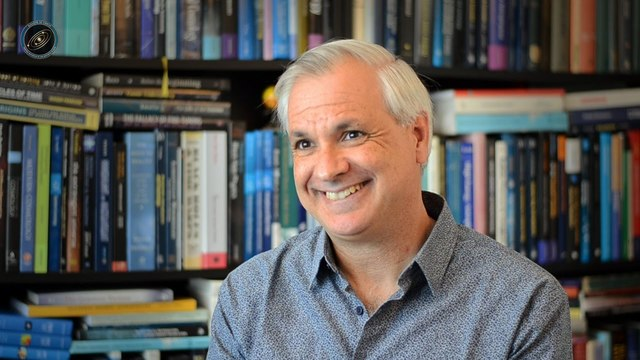
- Born: 20 September 1964 (age 62); La Plata, Buenos Aires
- Scientific career
- Fields: Relativistic astrophysics
- Workplaces: University of La Plata

Gustavo E. Romero is a professor of Relativistic Astrophysics at the University of La Plata in Argentina. In addition to his academic role, he serves as a Superior Researcher of the National Research Council of Argentina. Romero also holds the position of Director of the Argentine Institute of Radio Astronomy (IAR). Additionally, Romero has previously served as President of the Argentine Astronomical Society and is currently the leader of the GARRA research group and a Helmholtz International Fellow.

For his professional accomplishments, Romero has been honored with several notable awards in scientific research, including an award from the Argentine Academy of Sciences, the Houssay Prize and the Konex Award 2023.

== Research work ==
Romero has worked extensively on gamma-ray, neutrino and cosmic-ray astrophysics, black holes, and scientific philosophy. He is well known for his investigations of blazars, microquasars, and unidentified gamma-ray sources. His research has received around 11000 citations in the academic literature, making him one of the most cited scientists of Argentina.

In the field of philosophy, he has contributed with research on Supertask, spacetime ontology, and aesthetics. Romero is usually considered a disciple of the Argentine-Canadian philosopher and physicist Mario Bunge.

== Selected publications ==
- Hadronic gamma-ray emission from windy microquasars
- Unidentified 3eg gamma-ray sources at low galactic latitude
- Optical microvariability of southern AGNs
- Accretion vs. colliding wind models for the gamma-ray binary LS I+ 61 303: an assessment
- Gamma-ray emission from Wolf-Rayet binaries
- Reissner-Nordström black hole lensing
- Supernova remnants and γ-ray sources
- Linearized stability of charged thin-shell wormholes
- Hadronic high-energy gamma-ray emission from the microquasar LS I+ 61 303

== Books ==
- Introduction to Black Hole Astrophysics
- Scientific Philosophy
- La Naturaleza del Tiempo
- Contemporary Materialism: Its Ontology and Epistemology (Editor with Camprubi & Pérez-Jara)
