= Patient Zero (song) =

- Standard cover

Single by Taylor Swift

from the album The Life of a Showgirl: The Encore
- Written: October 2025
- Released: September 25, 2026
- Recorded: October 2025
- Genre: Pop
- Length: 3:46
- Label: Republic
- Songwriters: Taylor Swift; Max Martin; Shellback
- Producers: Taylor Swift; Max Martin; Shellback

Taylor Swift singles chronology
"I Knew It, I Knew You" (2026)	"Patient Zero" (2026)

Music video
- "Patient Zero" on YouTube

"Patient Zero" is a song by the American singer-songwriter Taylor Swift from the 2026 reissue of her twelfth studio album, The Life of a Showgirl (2025), subtitled The Encore. She wrote and produced the song alongside Max Martin and Shellback. It was released on September 25, 2026, through Republic Records, as the lead single from The Encore. The song recounts an emotionally abusive relationship and addresses a subject who is experiencing the same issues. Musically, it is a mid-tempo pop song led by a Celtic folk-inspired fiddle riff, a muted electronica arrangement, hip-hop percussion, and staccato vocals over disco beats.

The song received a mixed reception from music critics reviewing The Encore; some dubbed it the highlight amongst the bonus tracks and praised its twist on conventional lyrical tropes, while others considered it a weak track. In North America, "Patient Zero" topped both the US Billboard Hot 100 and Canadian Hot 100, making The Life of a Showgirl: The Encore Swift's first album since 1989 (2014) to contain three US number-one singles, and Swift the first artist to score 15 number-one songs in Canada. Elsewhere, it reached number one on the national charts of Australia, Austria, Germany, Ireland, Lebanon, New Zealand, Singapore, Switzerland, and the United Kingdom, as well as the overall Billboard Global 200.

Swift wrote and directed the music video for the song, which the Mexican cinematographer Emmanuel Lubezki shot. It premiered at the 2026 MTV Video Music Awards on September 27. The video took stylistic inspiration from thriller, true crime, and gothic cinema, and stars Swift as a ghost haunting an affluent couple played by Colin Farrell and Dakota Johnson. Matthew Stafford and Cara Delevingne also appear in guest roles.

== Background and release ==
On September 22, 2026, Swift launched a countdown scheduled to end at 2:00 p.m. Eastern Time Zone, without disclosing what it would reveal. Clues to the announcement were scattered across Swift's online presence, including replacing every letter "O" in her Instagram bio with zeros. On Spotify, animations were added to the play and pause buttons for each of Swift's albums, including sparkling effects. Additionally, Swift changed parts of her website ahead of the announcement and revealed cryptic messages through a Law & Order: Special Victims Unit sketch for her appearance at the 78th Primetime Emmy Awards on September 14.

After the countdown ended, Swift announced "Patient Zero" on social media. In the caption, Swift wrote that she was "impatiently waiting" to announce the song, accompanied by twelve exclamation marks and four zero emojis. Upon announcing the song, Swift made three versions of it available for pre-order: a CD single with a two-sided cover, as well as an acoustic and a piano version, each featuring two different photographs of the singer. The artwork for the standard CD version depicts Swift wearing a black dress and standing in front of a concrete wall, described as "elegant", while looking at the camera. The limited-edition CDs were scheduled to ship on October 13; however, shipping notifications for the pre-orders were sent out by October 5, and the song's CD sales counted toward the Billboard Hot 100 for the week ending October 8.

On September 23, Swift announced the reissue of her twelfth studio album The Life of a Showgirl, subtitled The Encore. It contains four additional tracks, including "Patient Zero" as its lead single. Swift said that she wrote these additional songs with Max Martin and Shellback in their studio in October 2025 when she took a trip to Sweden to celebrate the album's record-breaking success following its release earlier that month. On September 24, two 7-inch vinyls for "Patient Zero" were made available for 24 hours, marketed as "collector's edition" items. Both had the original track on Side A and the instrumental on Side B. They were sold in the variants "His Halo Version" and "Reflected Light Version". Easter eggs about "Patient Zero" were featured in the "Opalite" music video.

== Composition ==
Swift wrote and produced "Patient Zero" with Max Martin and Shellback. At 3 minutes and 46 seconds long, it is a midtempo pop track, anchored by a Celtic folk-inspired fiddle hook. It features an electropop production with hip-hop percussion and a subdued, electronica-influenced atmosphere, incorporating violins, country-inspired strings, and muted synth-pop and disco beats, consisting of synth-drums and warm keyboards, with her staccato vocals set against a steady groove. Mandolin and pedal steel are also subtly present in its mix.

The lyrics employ medical metaphors to recount a toxic past relationship and depict the narrator consoling someone similarly mistreated by the same man. Melodically, the song consists of long lines built on repeated notes in the same pitch, with subtle variations at the end. Throughout each section of lines, however, highly similar melodic motifs reappear alongside the recurring rhythm and regular chord changes that demarcate vocal stresses. The chorus is lyrically dense, with the final line ("I was patient zero") of each chorus featuring a pronounced pause. The verses consist of Swift's conversational lead vocals, supported by rhythmic background vocals and synth chords, creating a driving groove. The pre-choruses are structured as a call and response of Swift's fragmented "stop-start" lead vocal, with the chords and background vocals underneath.

The bridge is delivered in a sing-talking manner, with pointed inflections, "uh-huh" responses, and drums maintaining the song's rhythm in a sparser form. The final chorus begins with a breakdown, which drops into the original groove, followed by an outro that features the same melody and rhythm as the chorus but with new lyrics. Critics Ed Power and Aisling Murphy noted influences of Midnights (2022) in the song's production, while David Penn dubbed "Patient Zero" a musical hybrid of Swift's catalog of hits. He wrote that the song's electropop composition harkens back to her 2020s singles "Anti-Hero" (2022), "Cruel Summer" (2023), "Fortnight" (2024), and "The Fate of Ophelia" (2025); while its hip-hop rhythm recalls her 2010s singles "Blank Space" (2014), "Bad Blood" (2015), and "Look What You Made Me Do" (2017); whereas the folk hook is reminiscent of "Willow" (2020). Chris Molanphy found its "naggingly insistent" fiddle hook similar to the 1982 Dexys Midnight Runners single "Come On Eileen".

== Critical reception ==
"Patient Zero" received mixed reviews from music critics, although it was widely regarded as a standout track on The Encore. Jon Pareles of The New York Times picked "Patient Zero" as a highlight from The Encore, calling it a character study with an "airtight" musical structure. Melissa Ruggieri of USA Today admired the song's groove and vocal delivery, dubbing the bridge a standout. The Irish Times's Ed Power called "Patient Zero" the high point of The Encore bonus tracks. The Globe and Mail's Aisling Murphy questioned the song's placement as a deluxe track, considering it better than those on the standard edition. Chris Willman of Variety deemed the song's lyrical and sonic tonality to be a highlight in contrast to the rest of the album.

Chris Molanphy of Slate found the song engaging, with a "graceful" melody and a "contagious" hook, and compared its somber writing to that of an elegy and a novel "cataloguing the flaws of a trifling man". Business Insider's Callie Ahlgrim commended Swift for implementing "delicious metalayers at work" and identified literary influences of the books Rebecca (1938), The Madwoman in the Attic (1979), and Gone Girl (2012) in the song's lyrics and setting. David Penn of Billboard lauded the song's music, dubbing its melody, rhythm, and groove "infectious". He also praised the lyrics for their "fresh spin on the toxic-ex song: Instead of two women competing over the same man, the one who made it out is helping the next one recognize the pattern and understand what she's facing."

The Times's Will Hodgkinson liked the song's concept but felt that it was musically weaker than the other tracks on The Encore. Consequence's Cassidy Sollazzo also disliked the bridge for its spoken-word style and the song's overall dry production, but found the melody catchy. Sollazzo thought the song was derivative of Swift's eleventh studio album The Tortured Poets Department (2024), whereas The Guardian's Laura Snapes said the song reminded her of that album as well as her seventh studio album, Lover (2019); Snapes picked "Patient Zero" as the highlight amongst The Encore tracks. Exclaim!'s Alex Hudson liked the song's "stately" violins but criticized the hook, bridge, and the overall composition. Roisin O'Connor of The Independent criticized the lyrics for their perceived smug, "regurgitated" style, and the "clunky" bridge.

== Controversy ==
The song title was initially met with controversy. Vulture's Craig Jenkins found its use of the term "patient zero" to be awkward, as it originated from debunked 1980s research on HIV and was "used to demonize queer sex". The term was affiliated with Canadian flight attendant Gaëton Dugas in 1984, which, according to Attitude, has had connotations in LGBTQ history. Attitude faced criticism from Swifties online for the headline of its article "Did Taylor Swift make 'Patient Zero' for the gays? Inside the song's HIV/AIDS connotations", which they described as offensive and made in "poor taste". Prasanna Bachchav of ThePrint said it is a "new low" for Swift to revive the term, condemning her for "playing with queer history".

Other media outlets interpreted the song title as an allusion to the nature of Swift's fame. Anna Gibbs of Slate opined that the title may refer to the parasocial interaction and media scrutiny associated with Swift's personal life, highlighting the "harsh" reception she has received before, such as when Wendy Geller of Yahoo, in 2018, had remarked that Swift's romantic angst has spawned a catalog of songs "that's somewhat of an epidemic" and "plague", referring to Swift as the "initial case in this outbreak." In January 2024, Los Angeles Times critic Amy Kaufman had referred to Swift as "the patient zero for emotional contagion", whereas Sophie Wang of Harper's Bazaar dubbed 21st-century fame as the disease and Swift "the early guinea pig" who fought for ownership and against sexism, giving the concept of a patient zero more agency and a "Swiftian sort of twist".

Emmett Lindner of The New York Times commented that the term originated during the AIDS crisis and eventually entered the cultural lexicon, appearing in films and novels about dangerous pathogens. He said that the term's usage has changed over time, but is largely viewed as a controversial misnomer by scientific communities, and thus sometimes carries a social stigma. Lindner justified Swift's artistic use of the term, as it frames her as "patient zero" for the emotional turmoil caused by a former partner. He then highlighted Kaufman's description of Swift as "patient zero" in 2024 while discussing the cultural impact of Swift and Kelce. Global health professor Gavin Yamey and scientific philosophy academic Richard McKay published a paper in the British medical journal The BMJ following the renewed interest in the term. They said the term has been used during pandemics to blame patients, whereas Swift's song infuses it with a different meaning, "defanging" the taboo that is associated with that term and instead makes the term about the song subject's "survival" of the ordeal.

Following the song's announcement, US president Donald Trump's "Team Trump" social media account posted Swift-inspired imagery about immigration, including her song "Father Figure" (2025) and a mock CD cover featuring the album slogan "And, baby, that's show business for you." The account claimed that "zero (illegals) have crossed our borders in 16+ months."

== Commercial performance ==
On Spotify, "Patient Zero" became the most-streamed song by a female artist in a single day in 2026. The track debuted at number one on the Billboard Global 200, marking Swift's eighth chart-topper and tying her with BTS for the most number ones on the chart.

In the United States, "Patient Zero" became Swift's 16th number-one single on the Billboard Hot 100 and her 10th number-one debut, tying her with Drake for the most number-one debuts. The track also made her the first artist to earn three new number ones in a calendar year since Kendrick Lamar in 2024. "Patient Zero" marked Swift's 12th number one on Streaming Songs and her record-extending 33rd number one on Digital Song Sales. It also reached the top 10 on Pop Airplay, becoming her 30th top-10 single on the chart and tying her with Rihanna for the most top-10 entries. Following the debut of "Patient Zero" atop the Hot 100, The Life of a Showgirl became Swift's first album since 1989 to spawn three number-one songs. The song spent three weeks atop the Hot 100.

The song became Swift's 15th number one on both Australia's ARIA Charts and the Canadian Hot 100; on the latter, it made her the artist with the most chart-toppers. In the United Kingdom, "Patient Zero" became Swift's eighth number-one song, making The Life of a Showgirl her first album to produce three number ones in the country. She became the only artist to have three chart-toppers in the UK in 2026, and this also marked the first time that she achieved three number ones in a calendar year. "Patient Zero" became Swift's fourth number-one song in Germany and topped the charts in Austria, Ireland, Lebanon, New Zealand, Singapore, and Switzerland. It also reached the top 10 in Belgium (Flanders), Denmark, Luxembourg, the Netherlands, Norway, Portugal, Sweden, Taiwan, and the United Arab Emirates.

== Music video ==
A clip from the song's music video aired exclusively on CBS Mornings on September 24, 2026. The full video premiered at the 2026 MTV Video Music Awards on September 27 and was released on Apple Music, Spotify, and Amazon Music the same day. It was subsequently released on YouTube on September 29. Swift wrote and directed the music video, which Emmanuel Lubezki shot. It stars Swift, Colin Farrell, and Dakota Johnson, with cameo appearances from Cara Delevingne and Matthew Stafford. Previously, during Swift's appearance in the Emmys' Law & Order: SVU sketch, she teased the cast through a cryptic line: "Saccharide (a reference to Farrell, who stars in the series Sugar); Aries (referencing the Rams, Stafford's football team); From the Vineyard (referencing Delevingne's surname, which roughly translates to "from the vineyard" in French); North or South (a reference to Dakota Johnson, as in the US states)." The music video is Swift's 16th self-directed music video and the first on which she collaborated with Lubezki.

An eight-minute "Expanded Video" for "Patient Zero" was released on Apple Music on October 3 and on YouTube two days later. It features the making of the music video, with Swift discussing her creative process, directing scenes, and sharing behind-the-scenes moments with Farrell and Johnson. Swift said that the music video allowed her to experiment with different genres, such as gothic ghost stories, true crime accounts, and psychological thrillers. On October 13, a behind-the-scenes version of the music video titled "So Let's Get Into It Video" was released on Spotify. It includes footage of Swift interacting with the cast and crew, as well as her husband Travis Kelce visiting her on set.

=== Synopsis ===
The video begins in a snowy graveyard; Johnson approaches a specific tombstone, and Swift appears at her side shortly after. It then cuts to Farrell getting ready for the day and making Johnson a cup of tea. After Farrell leaves, Swift appears again at Johnson's bedside as she stares solemnly at a picture of her and Farrell's wedding. As they stare in bathroom mirrors adjacent to each other, Swift crosses over to Johnson's side and knocks over her cup of tea. The two then simultaneously swim in the pool in identical ways, before it cuts to Johnson vomiting in the toilet, with Swift comforting her and holding her hair.

The next few scenes demonstrate Johnson and Farrell's relationship before revealing Farrell's infidelity with another woman (played by Delevingne) and seemingly begging Johnson for forgiveness as a result. In their home, Johnson is holding a glass of wine when Swift once again knocks the drink right out of her hand. This leads to an argument between Farrell and Johnson, culminating in Johnson sobbing in her room with Swift by her side. At a gala where Farrell accepts an award, Johnson sees Swift across the room, wearing a dress identical to hers; she suddenly becomes disoriented and stumbles to the floor in front of everyone. On the car ride home, Johnson asks Farrell to slow down, but Farrell chastises her, claiming she "loves embarrassing [him]" and remains dismissive of her symptoms. He states: "I thought you were different." Confused, Johnson responds: "Different from who?"

The video then cuts to flashbacks of Swift and Farrell's previous relationship, with many scenes paralleling Johnson's current predicament. Farrell is seen adding a mysterious substance to Swift's tea before handing it to her; a newspaper headline reveals that Swift was an heiress who died under mysterious circumstances, with her husband (Farrell) inheriting her fortune. It is finally revealed that Swift's presence has actually been a ghost haunting Johnson and warning her of Farrell's misdeeds, as she uses the spilled drinks to draw the word "run" on the floor. The video ends with the front of the tombstone being revealed: "Wife and beloved daughter; gone too soon; 1986–2022", and Johnson leaving a black rose on the tombstone before departing.

=== Reception ===
Most publications described the "Patient Zero" music video as a romantic thriller with elements of goth and true crime, with a mirrored storyline structure—"two women, one pattern". Mehera Bonner of Cosmopolitan categorized it as a "moody drama", whereas Bea Isaacson of Paste called it a "stylish, dark, and atmospheric video". Today reporter Ariana Brockington remarked that the video ended with a "horror movie twist". Molanphy of Slate described it as a gloomy "mini-movie", while India Today dubbed it a romantic ghost story. Slant Magazine writer Alexa Camp praised the "committed" performances of Johnson and Farrell. She commented that the video "has all of the visual texture and panache of a contemporary Hollywood blockbuster" and praised "all sanded-down edges, soft focus, and milky white hues" of Lubezki's camera work. The Statesman complimented the characters and cinematography, saying that the video plays like a "small thriller" with a quiet and tense mood, different from a "typical pop shoot".

Billboard author Hannah Dailey dubbed the video a "sinister romance" that explores various dark topics such as uxoricide. Other critics also highlighted that themes of narcissism, manipulation, and gaslighting are depicted in the video. The American clinical psychologist Ramani Durvasula analyzed the video, describing it as a "masterclass in what happens in a narcissistic relationship", and highlighted Swift's accurate portrayal of a gaslighting partner. She praised the dialogue inside the car in particular for its depiction of psychological "utter isolation" and the traumatic bonding dynamic found in such relationships.

== Personnel ==
Adapted from Tidal

- Taylor Swift – vocals, writing, production
- Max Martin – writing, production, keyboards, piano, programming, recording
- Shellback – writing, production, drum kit, keyboards, programming, recording
- Andreas Wiberg – acoustic guitar
- Anders Pettersson – mandolin, pedal steel guitar
- Fredrik Burstedt – violin
- Randy Merrill – mastering
- Serban Ghenea – mixing
- Bryce Bordone – mixing, engineering
- Lasse Mårtén – engineering, recording

== Charts ==
=== Weekly charts ===
Chart performance
Chart (2026)	Peak position
Argentina Hot 100 (Billboard)	35
Argentina Airplay (Monitor Latino)	18
Australia (ARIA)	1
Australia Airplay (RCS)	2
Austria (Ö3 Austria Top 40)	1
Austria Airplay (MusicTrace)	8
Belarus Airplay (TopHit)	79
Belgium (Ultratop 50 Flanders)	4
Belgium (Ultratop 50 Wallonia)	28
Bolivia Anglo Airplay (Monitor Latino)	3
Brazil Hot 100 (Billboard)	35
Bulgaria Airplay (PROPHON)	9
Canada Hot 100 (Billboard)	1
Canada AC (Billboard)	1
Canada CHR/Top 40 (Billboard)	9
Canada Hot AC (Billboard)	2
Central America Anglo Airplay (Monitor Latino)	2
Chile Airplay (Monitor Latino)	11
Colombia Anglo Airplay (Monitor Latino)	5
CIS Airplay (TopHit)	42
Costa Rica Anglo Airplay (Monitor Latino)	3
Croatia (Billboard)	23
Croatia International Airplay (Top lista)	3
Czech Republic Airplay (ČNS IFPI)	32
Czech Republic Singles Digital (ČNS IFPI)	32
Denmark (Tracklisten)	7
Denmark Airplay (Tracklisten)	4
Dominican Republic Anglo Airplay (Monitor Latino)	2
Ecuador Anglo Airplay (Monitor Latino)	8
Estonia Airplay (TopHit)	1
Finland (Suomen virallinen lista)	16
France (SNEP)	11
France Airplay (SNEP)	41
Germany (GfK)	1
Global 200 (Billboard)	1
Greece International (IFPI)	2
Guatemala Anglo Airplay (Monitor Latino)	1
Hong Kong (Billboard)	6
Hungary (Single Top 40)	36
Iceland (Billboard)	25
Ireland (IRMA)	1
Israel (Mako Hitlist)	95
Italy (FIMI)	44
Italy Airplay (EarOne)	16
Jamaica Airplay (JAMMS)	5
Japan Hot Overseas (Billboard Japan)	1
Kazakhstan Airplay (TopHit)	181
Latin America Anglo Airplay (Monitor Latino)	4
Latvia Airplay (LaIPA)	1
Latvia Streaming (LaIPA)	6
Lebanon (Lebanese Top 20)	1
Lithuania (AGATA)	23
Lithuania Airplay (TopHit)	35
Luxembourg (Billboard)	5
Malaysia (IFPI)	14
Malaysia International (RIM)	9
Malta Airplay (Radiomonitor)	2
Mexico Anglo Airplay (Monitor Latino)	1
Middle East and North Africa (IFPI)	17
Moldova Airplay (TopHit)	96
Netherlands (Dutch Top 40)	13
Netherlands (Single Top 100)	3
New Zealand (Recorded Music NZ)	1
New Zealand Airplay (RCS)	8
Nicaragua Anglo Airplay (Monitor Latino)	5
Nigeria (TurnTable Top 100)	56
North Macedonia Airplay (Radiomonitor)	4
Norway (VG-lista)	8
Norway Airplay (IFPI)	58
Panama International (PRODUCE)	33
Panama Streaming (PRODUCE)	32
Peru Anglo Airplay (Monitor Latino)	11
Philippines (IFPI)	15
Philippines Hot 100 (Billboard Philippines)	10
Poland Airplay (OLiS)	11
Poland Streaming (OLiS)	28
Portugal (AFP)	3
Puerto Rico Anglo Airplay (Monitor Latino)	6
Romania (Billboard)	17
Romania Airplay (TopHit)	107
San Marino Airplay (SMRTV Top 50)	13
Singapore (RIAS)	1
Slovakia Airplay (ČNS IFPI)	11
Slovakia Singles Digital (ČNS IFPI)	37
Slovenia Airplay (Radiomonitor)	10
Spain (Promusicae)	38
South Africa Airplay (TOSAC)	3
South Africa Streaming (TOSAC)	18
South Korea Download (Circle)	127
Suriname (Nationale Top 40)	8
Sweden (Sverigetopplistan)	2
Switzerland (Schweizer Hitparade)	1
Switzerland Airplay (MusicTrace)	11
Taiwan (Billboard)	8
Thailand (Billboard)	17
United Arab Emirates (IFPI)	9
UK Singles (Official Charts)	1
Uruguay Anglo Airplay (Monitor Latino)	3
US Billboard Hot 100	1
US Adult Contemporary (Billboard)	12
US Adult Pop Airplay (Billboard)	3
US Pop Airplay (Billboard)	7
Venezuela Anglo Airplay (Monitor Latino)	4
Vietnam Hot 100 (Billboard)	65

=== Monthly charts ===
Monthly chart performance
Chart (2026)	Peak position
CIS Airplay (TopHit)	53
Estonia Airplay (TopHit)	4
Lithuania Airplay (TopHit)	42
Panama Streaming (PRODUCE)	147

== Certifications ==
Certifications
Region	Certification	Certified units/sales
United Kingdom (BPI)	Silver	200,000^{‡}
^{‡} Sales+streaming figures based on certification alone.

== Release history ==
Release formats and dates
Region	Date	Format	Version	Label	Ref.
Various	September 25, 2026	Digital download; streaming	Original	Republic	
United States	September 28, 2026	Hot adult contemporary radio	Original	Republic	
United States	September 29, 2026	Contemporary hit radio	Original	Republic	
Italy	October 2, 2026	Radio airplay	Original	Island	
Various	October 3, 2026	Streaming	Original; music video; expanded music video	Republic	
Various	October 9, 2026	Digital download	Acoustic	Republic	
Various	October 9, 2026	Digital download	Piano	Republic	
Various	October 13, 2026	CD single	Original	Republic	
Various	October 13, 2026	CD single	Acoustic	Republic	
Various	October 13, 2026	CD single	Piano	Republic	
Various	October 13, 2026	7-inch vinyl (Note: The two collector's edition 7-inch vinyls were named His Halo Version and Reflected Light Version.)	Original; instrumental	Republic	
Various	October 16, 2026	Streaming	Original; piano; acoustic	Republic	
