= Argentine Institute of Radio Astronomy =

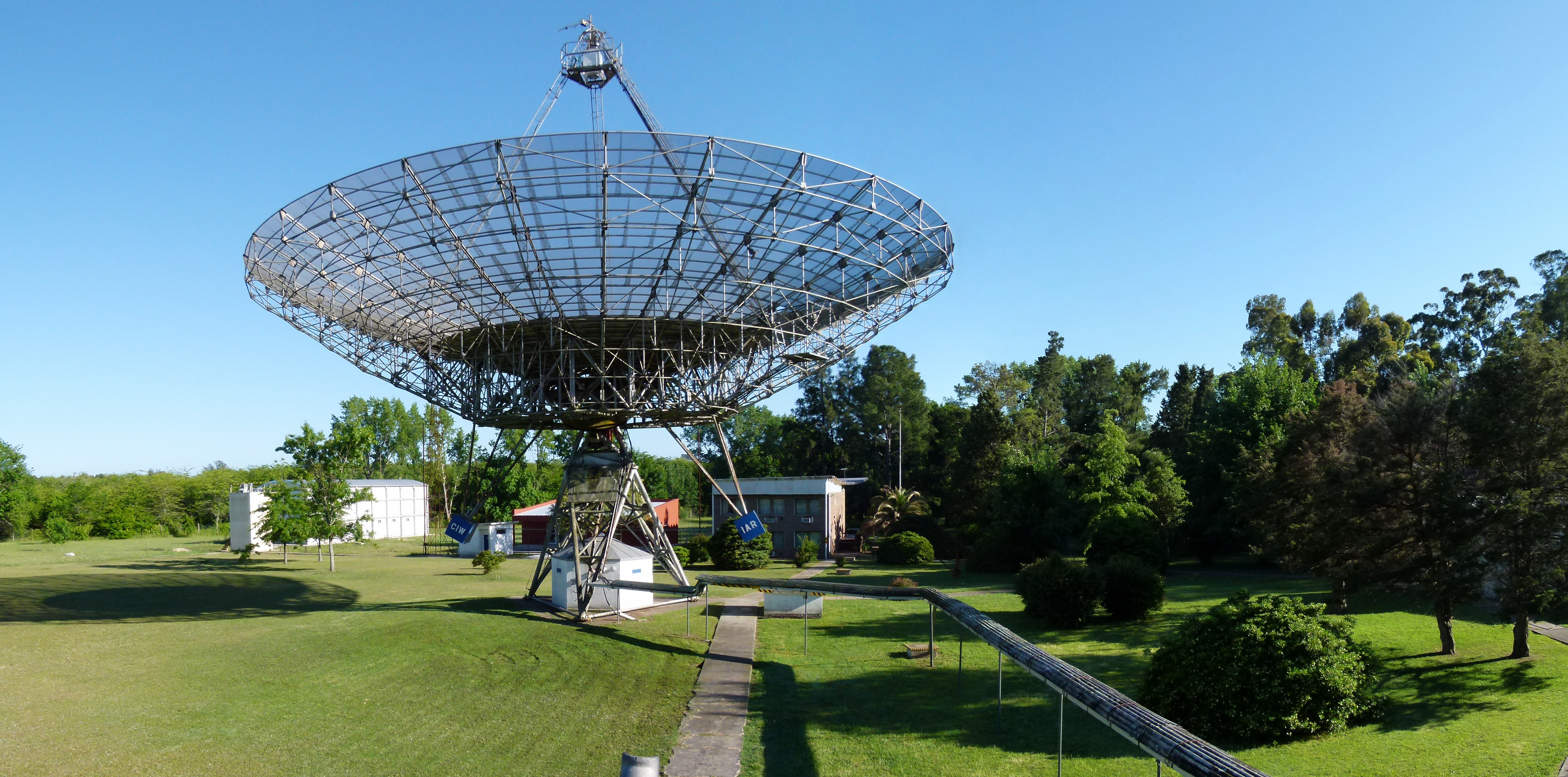

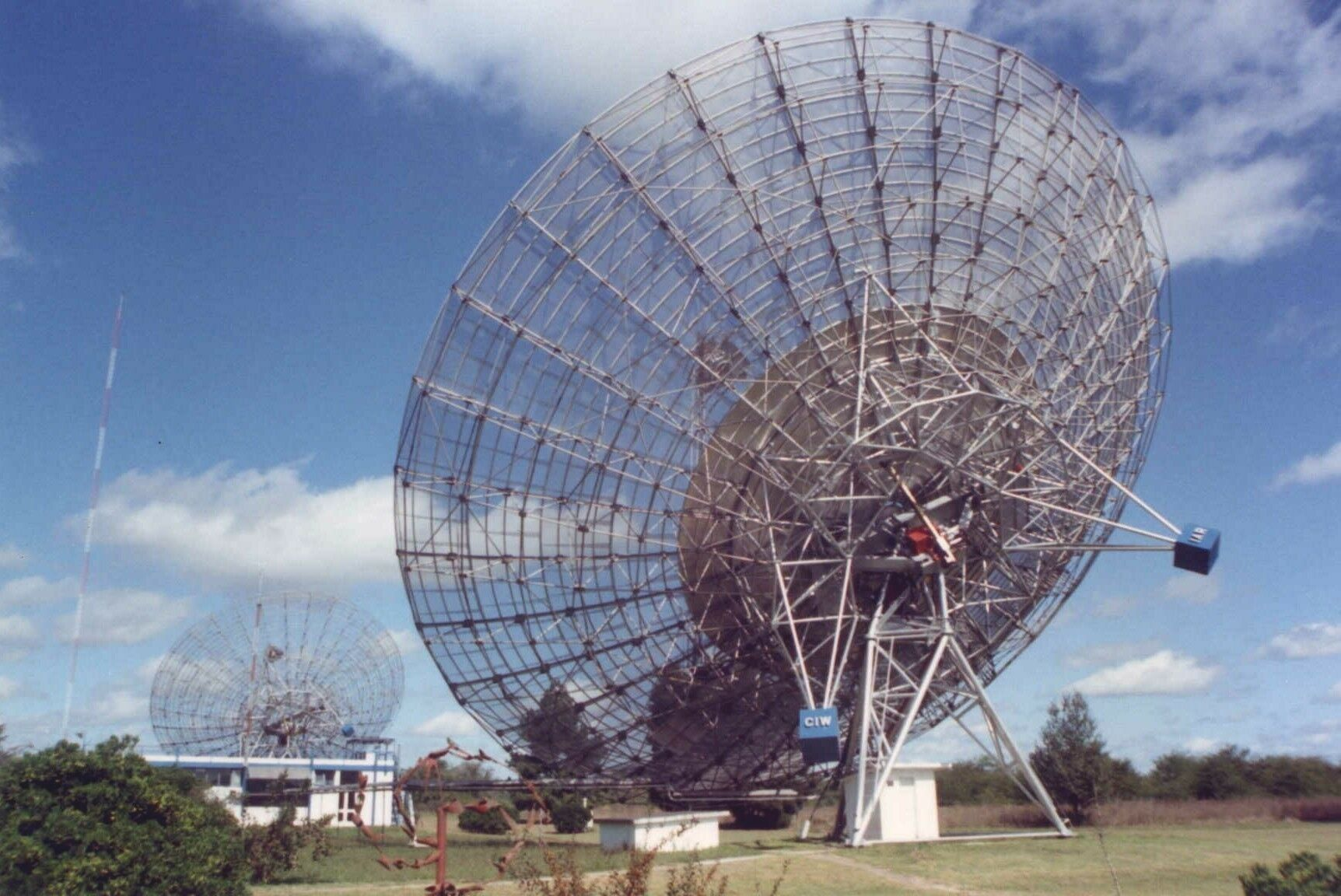
- Twin 30 m telescopes at the IAR
- Alternative names: IAR
- Location: Berazategui Partido, Buenos Aires Province
- Coordinates: 34°52′01″S 58°08′24″W
- Altitude: 20 m (66 ft)
- Website: www.iar.unlp.edu.ar
- Telescopes: IAR 30m telescopes; Large Latin American Millimeter Array
- Related media on Commons

The Argentine Institute of Radio Astronomy (IAR) was created in 1962 through an agreement between the scientific agencies CONICET and CIC, and the universities of La Plata (National University of La Plata) and Buenos Aires (University of Buenos Aires). Its functions are to promote and coordinate the research and technical development of radio astronomy in Argentina and to collaborate in the teaching and dissemination of astrophysics and related disciplines. The Institute continues its activities in the dependency of the National Council of Scientific and Technical Research (CONICET), the Commission of Scientific Research of the Province of Buenos Aires (CICPBA) and the National University of La Plata (UNLP). Its current director is Dr. Gustavo E. Romero and its deputy director, Dr. Paula Benaglia.

The institute is a major center for astronomical research, technological development and technology transfer. Research topics include high-energy astrophysics and compact objects, gravitation and numerical relativity, interstellar medium, planetary science, pulsar astronomy, massive stars, and machine learning with application to signal processing. The IAR has two twin radio telescopes with 30-meter reflective dishes operating at 1420 MHz. In the 1960s, the Carnegie Institution of Washington (CIW) collaborated by sending parts of the first antenna, while the second antenna was entirely built at IAR. Over the years, a variety of receivers have been used in these instruments.

== Historical facts ==
During 1957, the American astronomer Merle A. Tuve from the Carnegie Institution of Washington, motivated by the recent discoveries made by Harold Irving Ewen and Edward Mills Purcell at Harvard of the HI emission from the Galaxy, decided to extend the radio astronomical activity to the Southern Hemisphere. In order to accomplish this task, he visited the most important countries in South America, including Argentina, with the intention of building a regional radio observatory. Radio astronomy began in Argentina with the installation of an 86 MHz solar interferometer at the University of Buenos Aires, and the creation of the Commission for Astrophysics and Radio Astronomy (CAR).

After negotiations between Dr. Tuve and the president of CONICET at that time, Dr. Bernardo Houssay, CONICET created the National Institute of Radio Astronomy (INRA) on April 27, 1962. Dr. Carlos M. Varsavsky, from UBA, was chosen for the Direction of the institute, and Dr. Carlos Jaschek from La Plata Observatory, was appointed deputy director. The name of the new institute would later change to Argentine Institute of Radio Astronomy (IAR). In 1963, the first 30-meter antenna began to be built at the Pereyra Iraola Park (Partido de Berazategui), 20 km from the provincial capital city of La Plata, along with the necessary civil works to house the laboratories, workshops, control rooms and offices. On April 11, 1965, the emission line of neutral hydrogen was detected for the first time at the frequency of 1420 MHz (λ = 21 cm). A year later, on March 26, 1966, the radio astronomical observatory was officially opened at the IAR.

== Scientific activities ==
Research activities at the IAR cover the following topics:

- High-energy astrophysics and compact objects
- Massive stars and interstellar medium
- Star formation
- Planetary systems
- Pulsars and radio transients
- Intelligent signal processing
- Advanced technological applications
- Library science and information science

There are few research groups dedicated to radio astronomy in Argentina, and three of them are based on IAR. Currently, FRINGE, GARRA, GARX groups and PuMA collaboration operate at the IAR.

The Radio Interferometry Group (FRINGE) started in 2016 as an association of astronomers whose link involves carrying out interferometric studies in centimeter, millimeter, and submillimeter wavelengths. FRINGE is constituted by researchers and students from the Argentine Institute of Radio Astronomy and the National University of La Plata.

The Relativistic Astrophysics and Radio Astronomy Group (GARRA) was founded in April 2000 with the aim of developing and promoting research in relativistic astrophysics and cosmology from Argentina. The group currently embraces a wide variety of research topics, from particle acceleration and cosmic rays to theoretical gravitation and blazar astrophysics.

The X-ray Astrophysics Group (GARX) is a group of astrophysicists based at the Argentine Institute of Radioastronomy (IAR) and the National University of La Plata (UNLP). GARX is formed by Researchers, Postdocs, PhD and M. Sc. students supported by the Argentine Research Council (CONICET), with multiple national and international collaborators. Their research mainly focuses on X-ray binaries, accreting compact objects, such as neutron stars and black holes, and their extended counterparts, supernova remnants.

The Pulsar Monitoring in Argentina (PuMA) collaboration is devoted to the observation, analysis, and development of technology for the investigation of radio pulsars. The collaboration, made up of scientists and technicians from the IAR and the Rochester Institute of Technology, works with the two radio telescopes of the institute, conducting daily observational campaigns. The group collaborates with members of NANOGrav, helping to monitor millisecond pulsars with the aim of detecting gravitational waves.

In addition to these research groups, scientific research is carried out on planetary science, applied mathematics, and scientific philosophy. To learn more, see the institute website page.

== Technological development and technology transfer ==
The IAR's Technology Transfer Area was created during the first years of the new Millennium. The main reason for the creation of this area was the application of the know-how acquired in the field of radio astronomical instrumentation to the solution of specific needs that arise in other areas, particularly in communication and space science. The inherent dynamics of the transfer activities has allowed, over the course of a few years, to bring together numerous young professionals and advanced students from several branches of Engineering. Some of the projects in which the IAR was involved include the satellites SAOCOM, SAC-D, SARAT, SABIA MAR, and the launcher TRONADOR.

Currently, the institute is developing equipment for medical and sanitary use, applying control technology from the space field.

=== Recent Projects and Developments ===
In recent years, the IAR has participated in projects funded by CONICET, the former Ministry of Science, Technology and Innovation (MINCyT), and the Undersecretariat of Science, Technology and Innovation of the Province of Buenos Aires (FITBA). Some of the most relevant include:

COVID-19 Solutions

- Non-invasive mechanical ventilator.
- Ozone generator for disinfecting public and private spaces.
- Strategies for impact on public transportation.

Medical Industry

- ITM: Microwave imaging tomograph, in conjunction with IFLYSIB.
- Technological upgrade and automation of hoppers for pediatric infant formula (Children's Hospital of La Plata, FITBA 2023).

Scientific Projects

- MIA: Multipurpose Interferometry Array, with up to 16 antennas for radio astronomy, unique in Latin America.

Productive Sector

- IoT sensor network for vegetable oil production (La Matanza Oil Cooperative, COFECyT 2022 and FITBA 2024).
- Design, manufacturing, and measurement of antennas for telecommunications.
- Design, manufacturing, and measurement for radio frequency systems.
- Design, manufacturing, and measurement of analog and digital data acquisition systems.
- Breathalyzer for the zero-tolerance alcohol law for drivers (FITBA 2023).

Institutional Development

- IoT monitoring of the electrical supply system and remote fuel management.
- IoT personnel access and instrument management system, enabling different levels of access to the institute's spaces.

== Observatory ==
The IAR has two radiometers with main reflectors of 30 meters in diameter, dubbed Carlos Varsavsky and Esteban Bajaja, respectively. Due to their characteristics, the IAR radio telescopes are ideal for undertaking projects whose main purpose is the observation of large areas of the sky or projects related to timing of compact sources.

The radio telescopes have also been used to carry out numerous variability studies of blazers, to investigate the radio environments of gamma-ray sources, and in the discovery of supernova remnants.

Currently, the antennas are conducting studies of transient radio sources and pulsars, the first observations of this type in Latin America. This project, led by the PuMA group, is collaborating with NANOgrav and RIT for the upgrade and fine-tuning of the radio telescopes.

On the other hand, the Multipurpose Interpherometric Array (MIA) and the Lunar Antenna for Radio Astronomy (LARA) stand out as projects that expand the institute's capabilities in studying the sky at radio frequencies and exploring new observation techniques.

The MIA Project consists of the development and installation of an antenna array that, using interferometry techniques, operates in a coordinated manner as a single system. This configuration significantly improves both the sensitivity and angular resolution of the array, enabling the detection of weak signals and the acquisition of more precise images of the sky. Furthermore, the use of interferometry facilitates the formation of synthetic beams and the coverage of a wider area without the need to individually increase the size of each antenna, thus optimizing project resources.

The development carried out at the IAR encompasses everything from the installation of 4-meter diameter parabolic antennas to the design and construction of the receivers, as well as the signal acquisition and processing systems. Currently, the first prototype of the project is under development. This prototype consists of three antennas installed on the IAR premises. It allows for testing and optimization of interferometry techniques, signal correlation, and processing algorithms, laying the groundwork for the future expansion of the array and the improvement of its sensitivity and angular resolution.

The Lunar Antenna for Radio Astronomy (LARA) project is a radio astronomy observatory project that will be integrated as a payload on a satellite orbiting the Moon or, ideally, the L2 Lagrange point. It is designed to be both a scientific instrument and a technology demonstrator. LARA will allow for the testing and development of various technologies applied to scientific research, particularly radio astronomy from space, a field still in its infancy with few ongoing space missions.

From a technological standpoint, LARA will represent an initial exploration of microsatellite technologies scaled up to more ambitious contexts, while maintaining the characteristics that make these technologies attractive: ease of deployment, operational robustness, low cost, moderate energy consumption, and low weight.

The scientific products generated by the LARA project will be useful to the scientific community and will also serve as an incentive for the development of new missions that can expand the scope and quality of these products. From a strategic perspective, the project will position the Argentine scientific and technological system among those capable of operating beyond Earth orbit, taking advantage of the opportunities offered by new lunar missions. LARA is a relatively low-cost project with a high technological and scientific return, requiring a strategic partnership with a partner to provide the platform on which the instrument will be hosted.

== See also ==
- List of astronomical observatories
- List of astronomical societies
- Lists of telescopes
