= Plateau de Bure Interferometer =

Former astronomical observatory

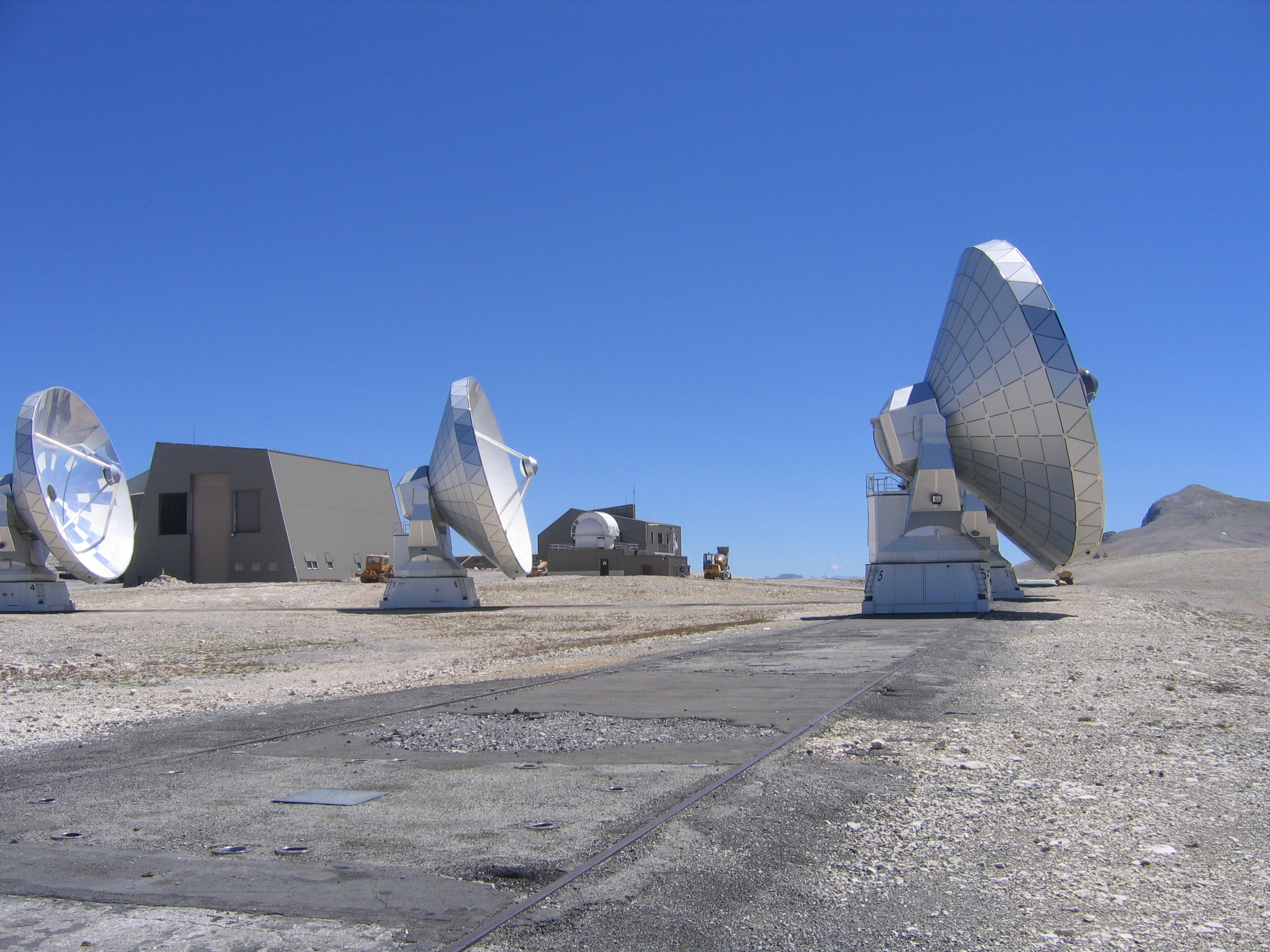
- Several of the interferometer's antennas, with one of the rails for antenna displacement in the foreground.
- Alternative names: PdBI
- Location(s): Grenoble, canton of Grenoble-5, arrondissement of Grenoble, Isère, Auvergne-Rhône-Alpes, Metropolitan France, France
- Coordinates: 44°38′02″N 5°54′29″E
- Altitude: 2,550 m (8,370 ft)
- Website: www.iram-institute.org
- Location of Plateau de Bure Interferometer
- Related media on Commons

The Plateau de Bure Interferometer (PdBI) was a six-antenna interferometer on the Pic de Bure (2550 m) in the French Alps, operated by the Institut de radioastronomie millimétrique. In 2014, it has been replaced by the Northern Extended Millimeter Array. It was specifically designed for millimetre-wave observations and specialises in studies of line emission from molecular gas and radio continuum of cold dust.

The interferometer consisted of six antennas with a diameter of 15 m each. These antennas could be placed in a T-shaped pattern, with north–south track of 368 m and an east–west track of 768 m. There were 32 stations along these tracks where the antennas can be positioned. Observing bands are at 3, 2, 1.8 and 0.8 mm. At an observing wavelength of 3 mm (100 GHz frequency) each of these telescopes could resolve two objects 45 arcseconds apart from each other on the sky. In an interferometer, these 45″ are actually the size of the field of view. So an interferometer like this one images, at very high resolution (better than 1″), structures smaller than 45″.

== Aerial tramway ==
The observatory was serviced by an aerial tramway.

=== 1999 accident ===
On 1 July 1999, an aerial tramway car fell 80 metres (260 ft) to the valley floor. All 20 occupants were killed, in one of the worst cable car accidents in recorded history. The majority were employees and contractors of the observatory.

== See also ==
- List of radio telescopes
- List of astronomical observatories
- CARMA, another millimetre-wave array operated by a consortium including Caltech, University of California Berkeley, University of Illinois, University of Maryland and University of Chicago.
- Atacama Large Millimeter Array, a large (sub)millimetre-wave array.
- Northern Extended Millimeter Array
