= Qubic experiment =

Astronomical experiment

Q&U Bolometric Interferometer for Cosmology
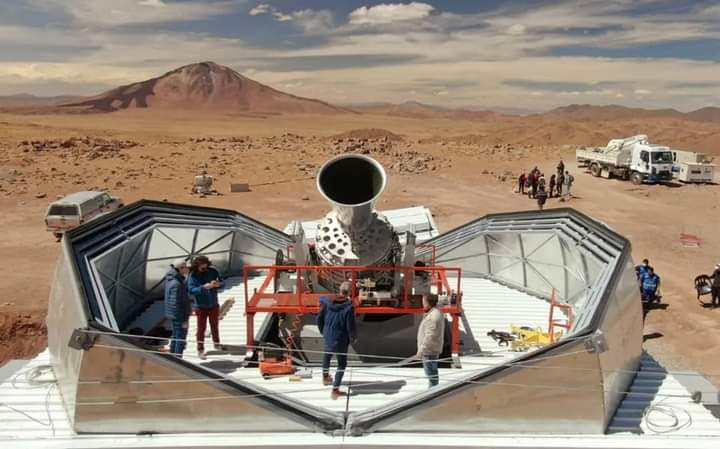
- Alternative names: Qubic experiment
- Location(s): Puna de Atacama
- Coordinates: 24°11′32″S 66°28′29″W
- Altitude: 4,820 m (15,810 ft)
- Wavelength: 150, 220 GHz (2.0, 1.4 mm)
- Telescope style: bolometer radio interferometer
- Website: www.qubic.org.ar
- Location of Qubic experiment
- Related media on Commons

QUBIC is a cosmology project to study cosmic inflation by measuring the B-modes of the polarization of the Cosmic Microwave Background (CMB), by observing the sky with a millimeter wave radio telescope interferometer. It uses bolometric interferometry, which combines the advantages of interferometry (reduction of systematic errors) and those of the bolometer detectors (high signal sensitivity). QUBIC observes the sky at two frequencies, 150 and 220 GHz, so that it can separate the cosmological signal from foreground emission, in particular thermal dust emission.

The QUBIC project began in 2008 with the merger of BRAIN and MBI projects. A technical demonstrator of the instrument is being manufactured and should be tested in France in 2017.

On 26 October 2022 the first module was installed and began operating.

QUBIC is an international collaboration involving universities and laboratories in Ireland, France, Italy, Argentina, the U.K. and the U.S.A.

== Observing instrument ==
The observing instrument is a millimeter wave interferometer contained in a cryostat which is cooled to 4K with pulse tube coolers, to avoid contaminating the received signal with thermal radiation. The millimeter waves pass through a 45 cm polyethylene window in the cryostat and then through a rotating half-wave plate which modulates the polarization, followed by a polarizing grid which selects one of the two polarizing angles. The radiation then passes through an array of 400 microwave horns which form multiple beams. The beams are then combined with two convex mirrors to form an interference pattern. The observed beam is the sum of the interferometry fringe patterns. The distance between the peaks of the observed beam is frequency-dependent, so this allows spectral imaging.

== Observing site ==
Since millimeter waves are absorbed by water vapor in the atmosphere the device must be located at high altitudes above most of the atmosphere. The instrument has been installed at the Large Latin American Millimeter Array (LLAMA) site at Alto de Chorillo near Salta, Argentina, at an altitude of 4,825 meters (15,830 ft).
