= IRAM 30m telescope =

Radio telescope in Spain

IRAM 30-metre telescope
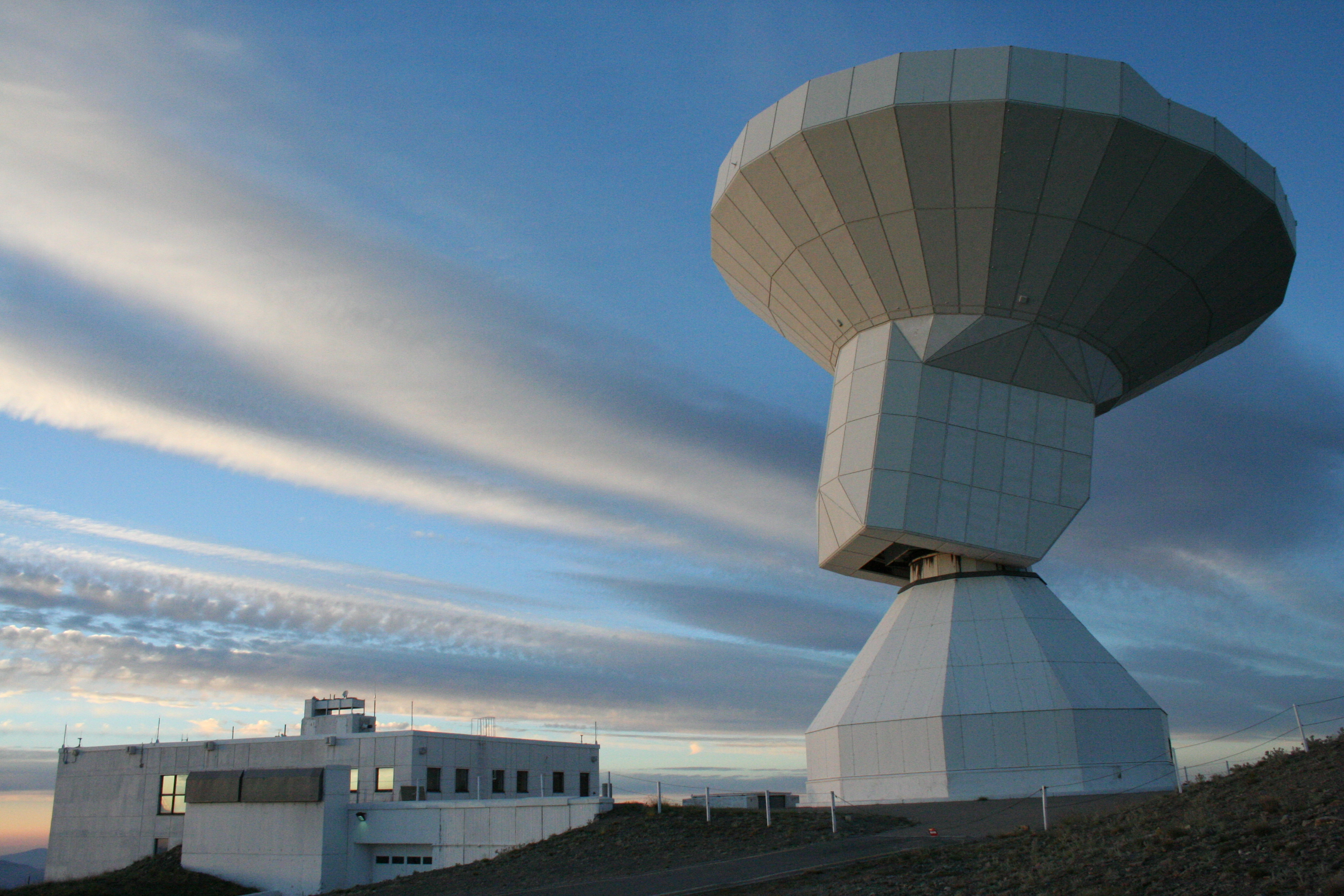
- Alternative names: Pico Veleta observatory
- Location(s): Granada, Province of Granada, Spain
- Coordinates: 37°03′58″N 3°23′34″W
- Altitude: 2,850 m (9,350 ft)
- Wavelength: 0.8 mm (370 GHz)–3 mm (100 GHz)
- Diameter: 30 m (98 ft 5 in)
- Website: iram-institute.org/observatories/30-meter-telescope/
- Location of IRAM 30-metre telescope
- Related media on Commons

The IRAM 30m telescope is a radio telescope, located in the Sierra Nevada Mountain Range, Spain. It is operated by the Institute for Radio Astronomy in the Millimetre Range (IRAM) for observing astronomical objects in the millimetre range of the electromagnetic spectrum. With its large surface and wide-angle camera, the telescope is capable of exploring vast cosmic objects. It is one of the largest and most sensitive millimetre wavelength telescopes in the world, serving over 200 astronomers annually. The telescope is primarily used to study interstellar clouds, star nurseries, galaxies, and black hole jets.

Together with IRAM's other facility, the NOEMA observatory, the telescope is part of the global Event Horizon Telescope array. It was the only station in Europe to participate in the 2017 EHT observing campaign that produced the first image of a black hole.

== Operation ==
Built from 1980 to 1984, the telescope operates at 2850 meters above sea level. Due to its large surface in the shape of a bowl and 420 panels adjusted to a precision of 55 micrometres, the IRAM is one of the most sensitive single dish radio telescopes in the world. The telescope can be pointed towards a celestial source, allowing astronomers to build up radio images of complete galaxies or regions of star formations.

The telescope is equipped with a suite of heterodyne receivers and continuum cameras operating at wavelengths of around 0.8, 1.0, 2.0, and 3.0 millimetres. The telescope can observe these wavelengths simultaneously, allowing it to produce multiple images of the same region in different wavelengths at once.

IRAM offers guided tours through the observatory and public talks during the summer months. A virtual tour is provided on IRAM's website.

== Science ==
Unlike optical astronomy telescopes, which are suitable for observing hot objects which emit visible radiation, radio telescopes that operate in the millimetre wavebands can view much colder objects that emit lower frequency radiation. For instance, supermassive black holes are very cold, with some larger black holes on the order of 10^{−14} Kelvin. Other cold cosmic objects include planets, distant galaxies, and large gas clouds.

As part of the Event Horizon Telescope array, the IRAM 30-meter telescope obtained the first-ever image of a black hole. The IRAM 30-meter telescope also produced the first high-resolution radio observations of the heart of the Milky Way galaxy and its black hole named Sagittarius A* in 1995 along with the NOEMA. Together with NOEMA, it discovered one-third of the interstellar molecules known to date.

== Gallery ==
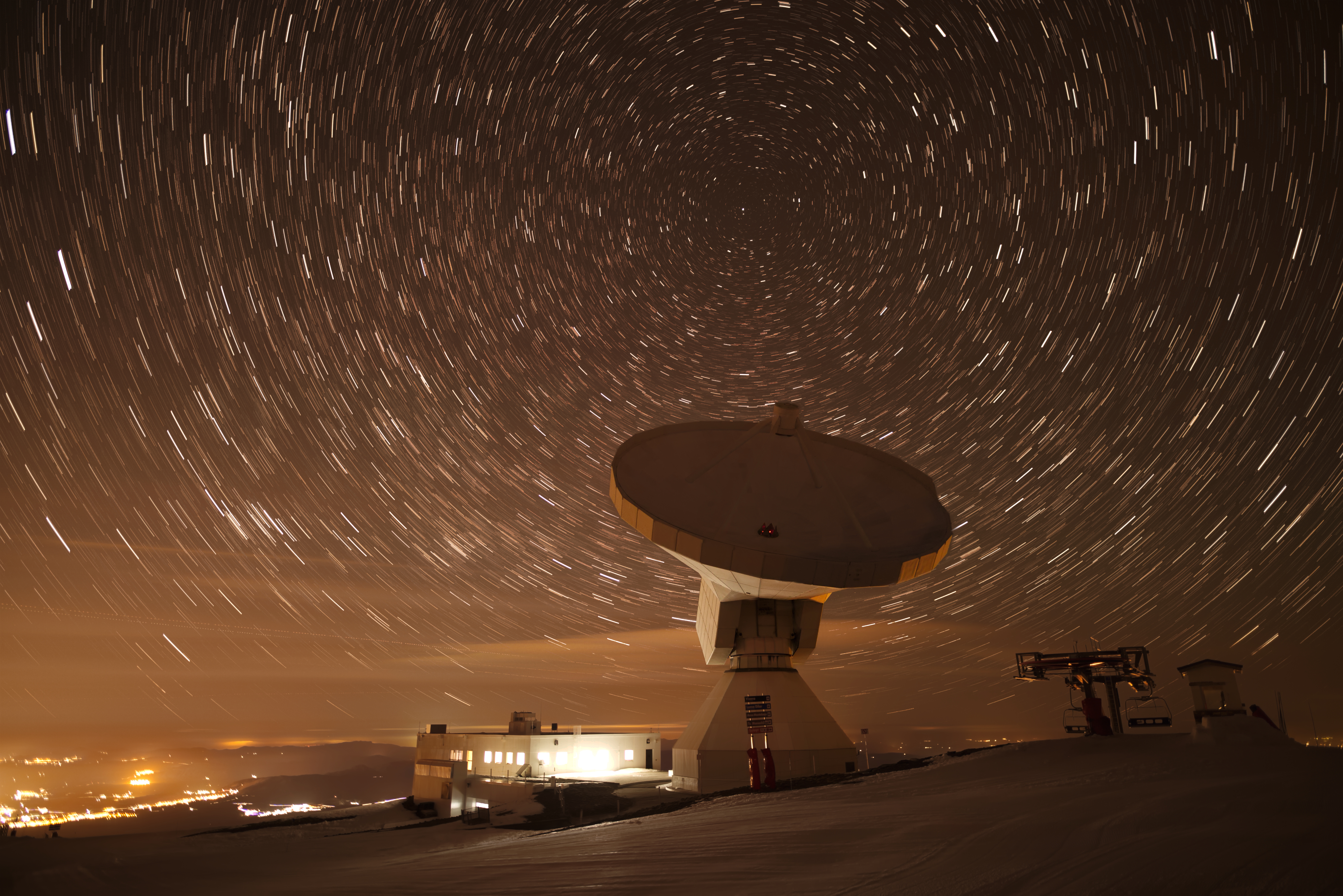
The IRAM 30-meter telescope scanning the night sky

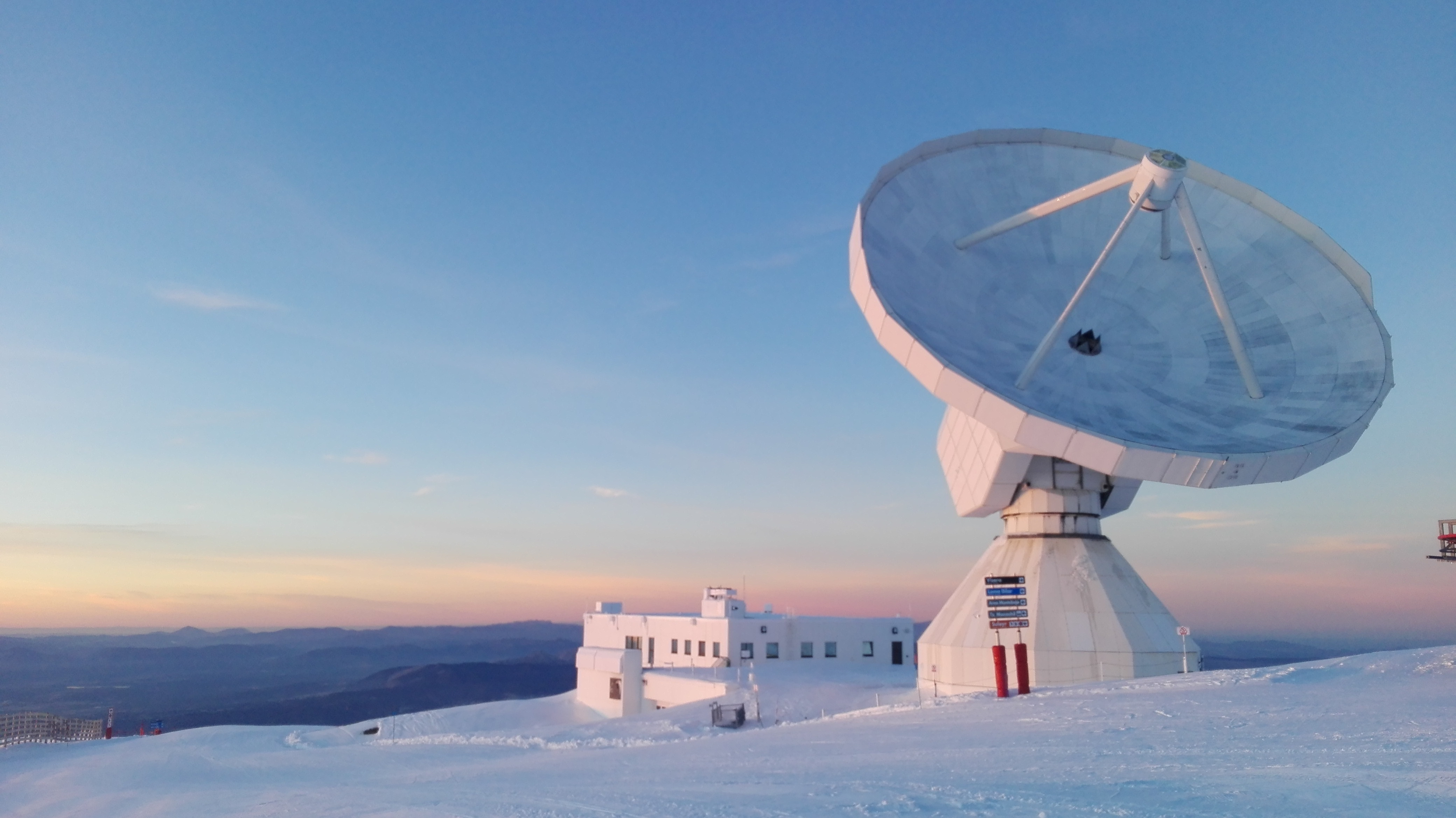
The IRAM 30-meter telescope

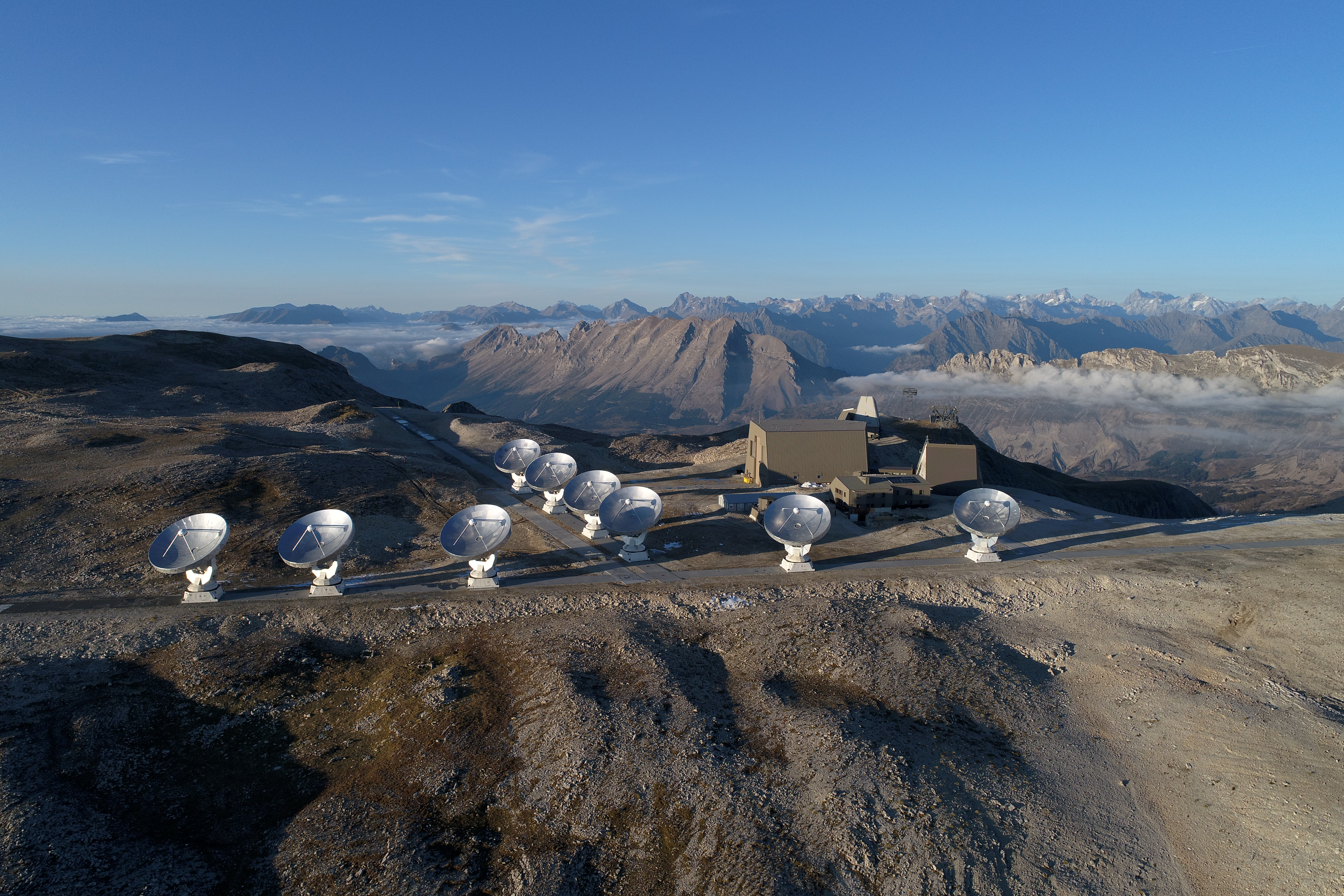
The NOEMA observatory, IRAM's second facility
