= Institut de radioastronomie millimétrique =

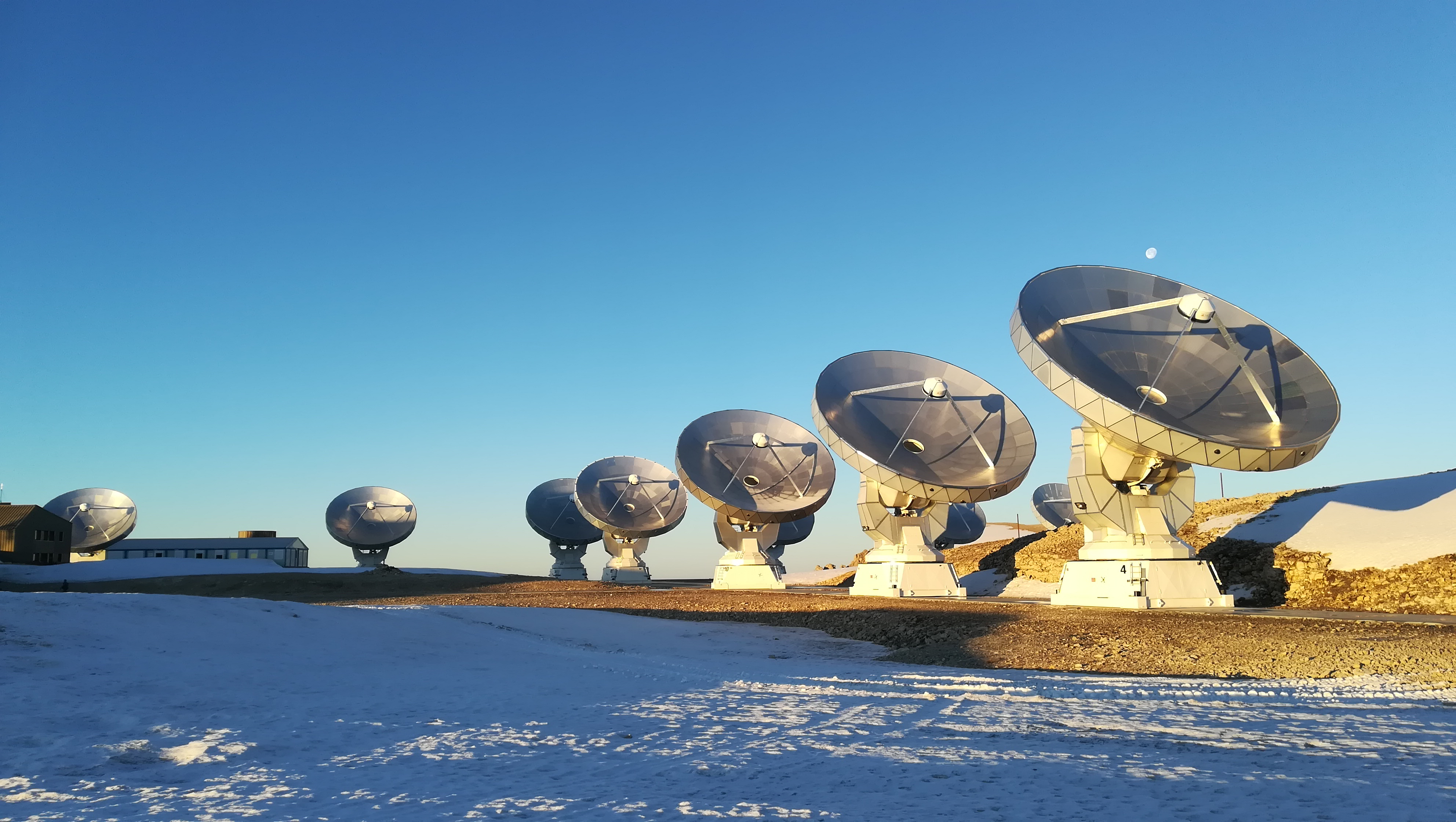
- The NOEMA observatory operated by IRAM
- Alternative names: IRAM
- Location: Grenoble, Saint-Martin-d'Hères, France
- Coordinates: 45°11′37″N 5°45′38″E
- Website: www.iram-institute.org
- Telescopes: IRAM 30m telescope; Northern Extended Millimeter Array
- Location of Institut de radioastronomie millimétrique
- Related media on Commons

Institut de Radioastronomie Millimetrique (IRAM) is an international research institute and Europe's leading center for radio astronomy at millimeter wavelengths. Its mission is to explore the universe, study its origins and its evolution with two of the most advanced radio facilities in the world:

- The NOEMA observatory (NOrthern Extended Millimeter Array), an array of currently eleven 15-meter antennas located in the French Alps on the Plateau de Bure at more than 2550 meters above sea level. NOEMA is the most powerful millimeter observatory of the Northern Hemisphere.
- The IRAM 30-meter telescope, located at 2850 meters altitude on Pico Veleta in the Spanish Sierra Nevada (Andalucia, Spain). The telescope is the world's premier single-dish facility for astronomical research in the millimeter wavelength range.

Both sites are at high altitude to reduce the absorption by water vapour in Earth's atmosphere.

The telescopes are supported by the IRAM offices and laboratories in Granada and Grenoble, respectively. The IRAM headquarters are on the campus of Université Grenoble Alpes near Grenoble. More than 120 scientists, engineers, technicians and administrative personnel work for the IRAM organization. The institute's laboratories cover the complete field of high frequency technology. IRAM staff develop cutting edge technology for the IRAM facilities and to the benefit of the international astronomical community.

== Facilities and research ==
The principal activity of IRAM is the study of mostly cold matter (interstellar molecular gas and cosmic dust) in the Solar System, in our Milky Way, and other galaxies out to cosmological distances in order to determine their composition, physical parameters and history. Compared to optical astronomy, which is sensitive to the hot universe (stars are generally a few thousand degrees Celsius), radiotelescopes that operate in the millimeter wavebands, such as NOEMA or the IRAM 30-meter telescope, probe the cold universe (around -250 degrees Celsius). They are able to see the formation of the first galaxies in the universe, to observe super-giant black holes at the center of galaxies, to analyze the chemical evolution and dynamics of nearby galaxies, to detect organic molecules and possible key elements of life and to investigate the formation of stars and the appearance of planetary systems.

IRAM's facilities have done pioneering work and made a large number of astronomical discoveries. NOEMA has observed the most distant galaxy known to date. Together with the IRAM 30-meter telescope it made the first complete and detailed radio images of nearby galaxies and their gas. NOEMA also obtained the first image of a gas disk surrounding a double star system (Dutrey al. 1994). Its antennas captured for the first time a cavity in one of these disks, a major hint for the existence of a planetary object orbiting the new star and absorbing matter on its trajectory (GG tau, Piétu et al. 2011). The IRAM facilities have discovered one third of the interstellar molecules known to date (published ApJ, 2018, Brett A. McGuire).

Both IRAM observatories are part of the Event Horizon Telescope (EHT), a global array of radio telescopes. In 2017, IRAM participated in the observations that lead to the publication of the first ever image of a black hole.

== History ==
IRAM was founded in 1979 and is operated as a French-German-Spanish collaboration. Its partner institutes are the Centre national de la recherche scientifique (CNRS, France), the Max Planck Society (MPG, Max Planck Gesellschaft, Germany), and the Instituto Geográfico Nacional (IGN, Spain). Today, the institute is considered a model of scientific multinational cooperation.

== Global outreach ==
IRAM supports the scientific research of more than 5000 astronomers worldwide. The institute maintains close research partnerships with high-profile universities and research organizations in North-America and China as well as with other radio-astronomical facilities including the ALMA observatory in the Southern Hemisphere. In 2016, The University of Michigan Astronomy Department signed into an agreement allowing access to NOEMA . In 2017, the University of Nanjing (China) and the Purple Mountain Observatory (Chinese Academy of Sciences) followed.

IRAM also exports its technical and instrumental know-how. Transnational organizations like the European Space Agency benefit from IRAM's developments for their space missions.

== Gallery ==
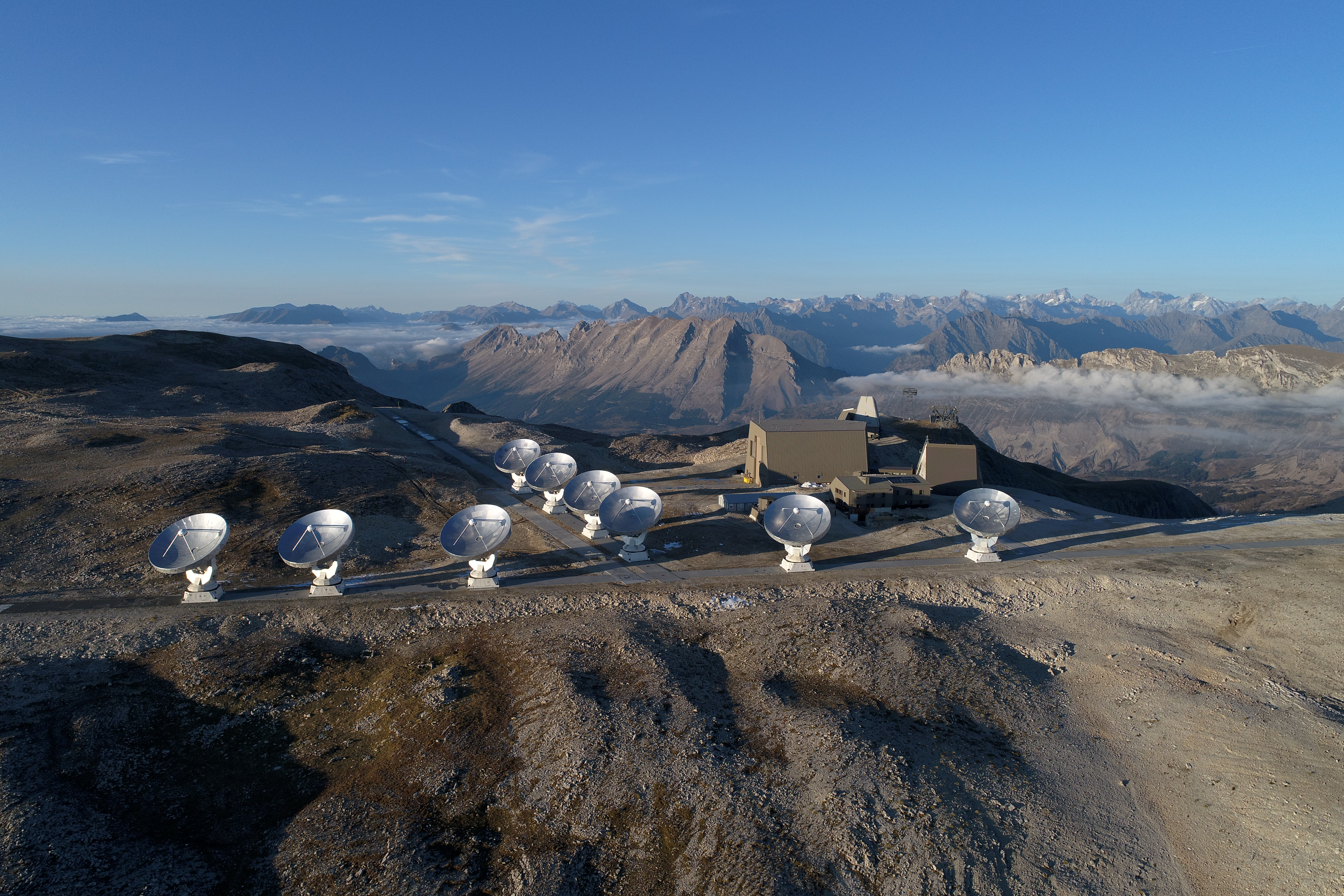
The NOEMA observatory operated by IRAM

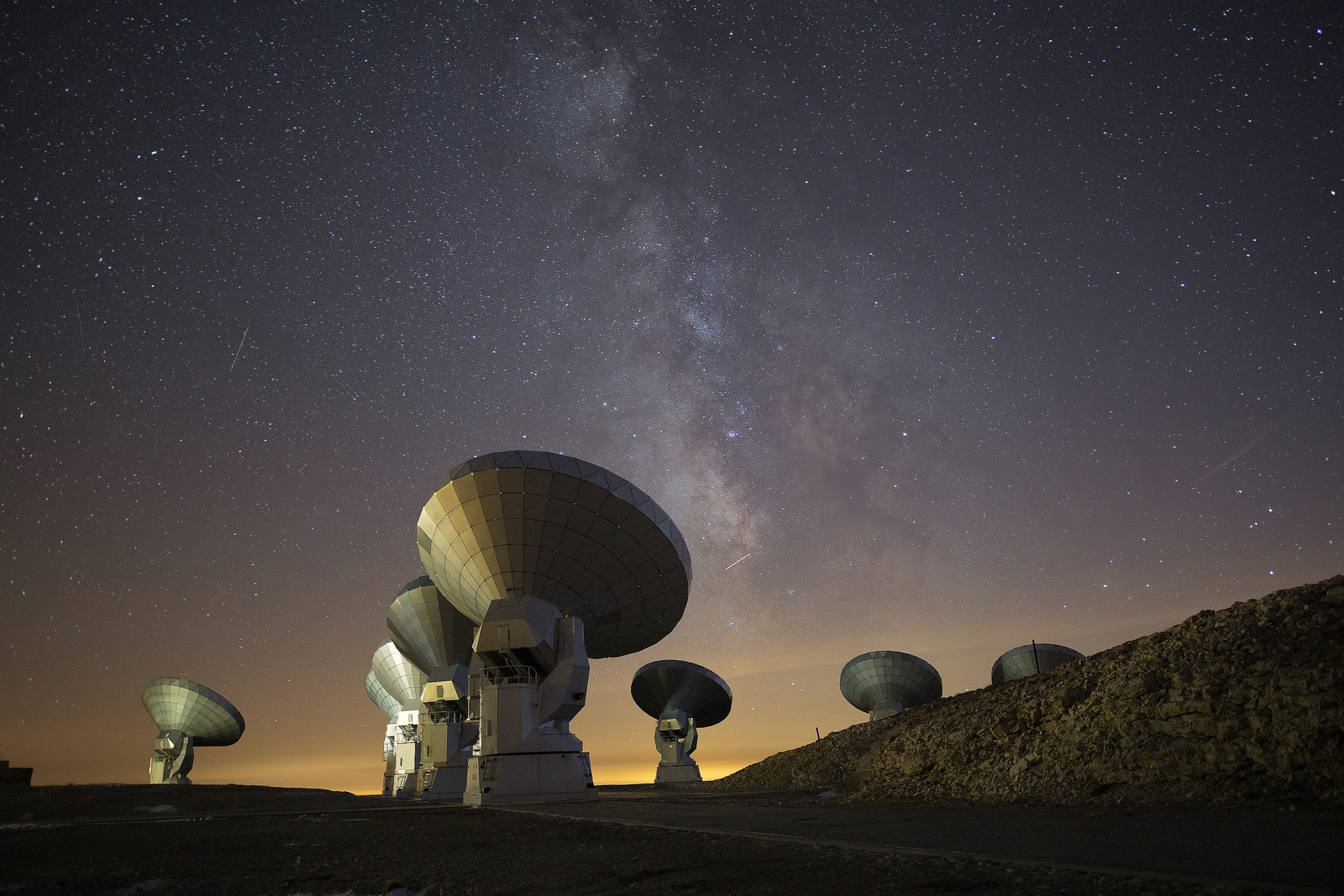
NOEMA antennas under the Milky Way

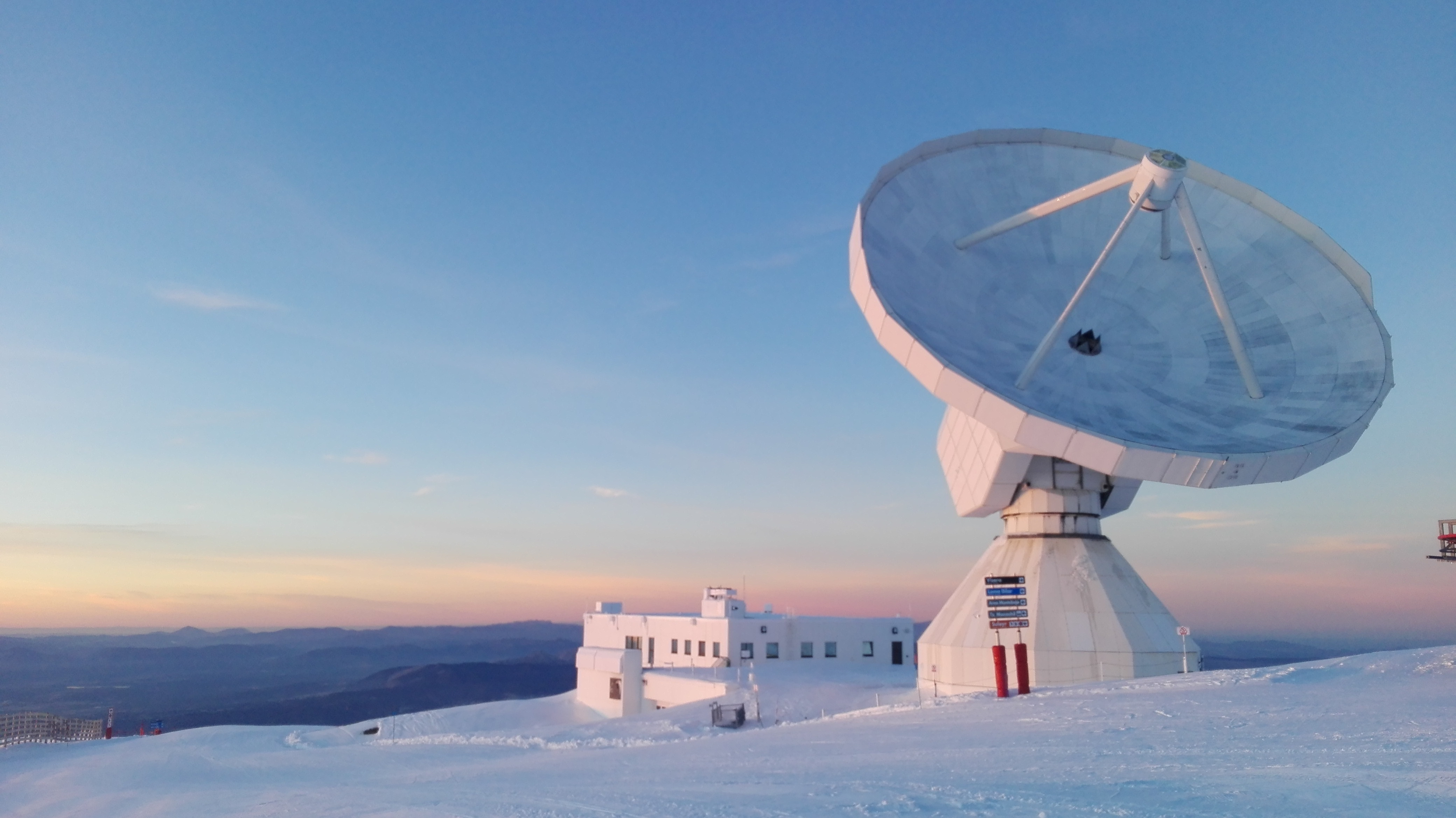
The IRAM 30-meter telescope

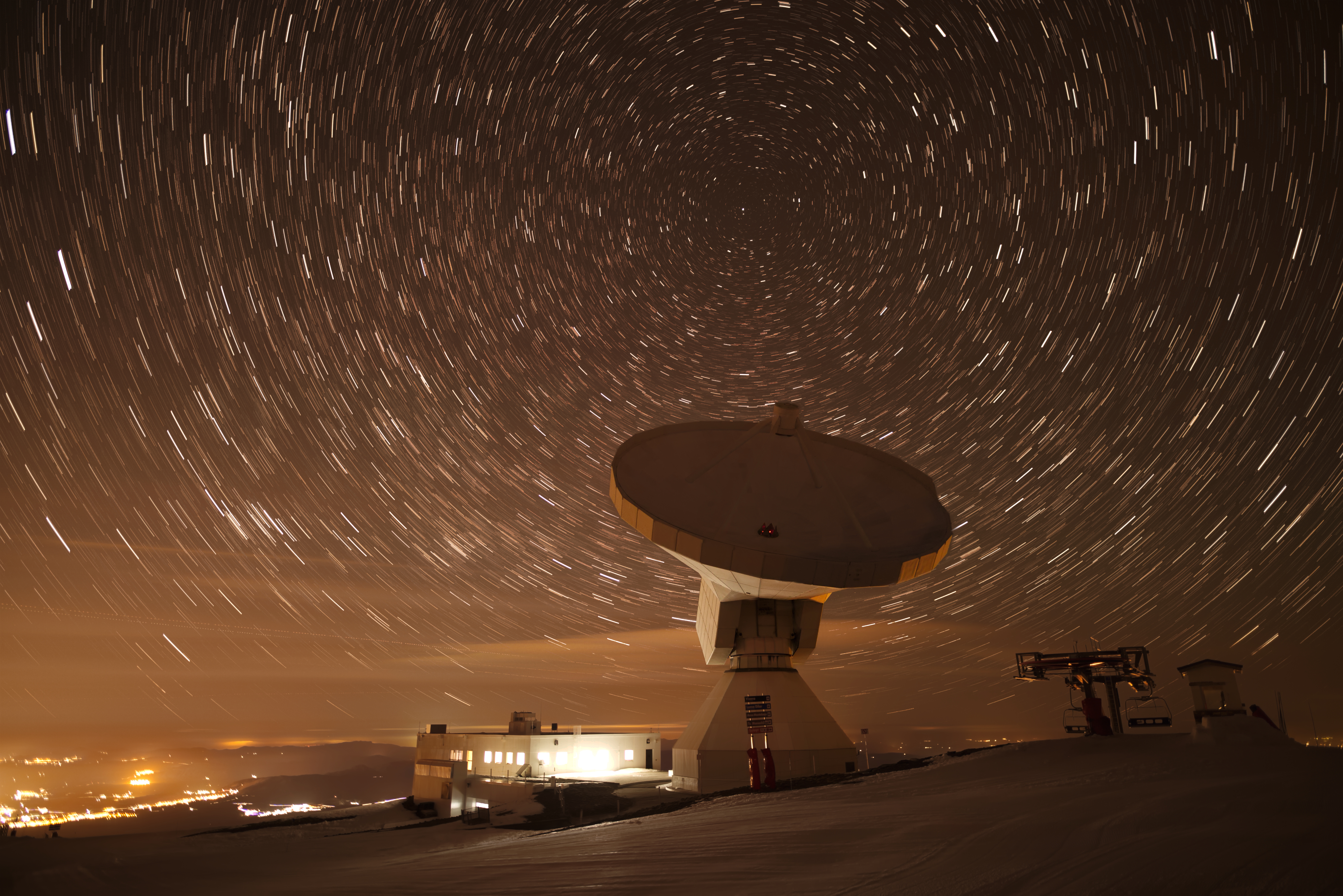
The IRAM 30-meter telescope observing by night

== See also ==
- List of astronomical observatories
- List of radio telescopes
