= Scientific philosophy (metaphilosophy) =

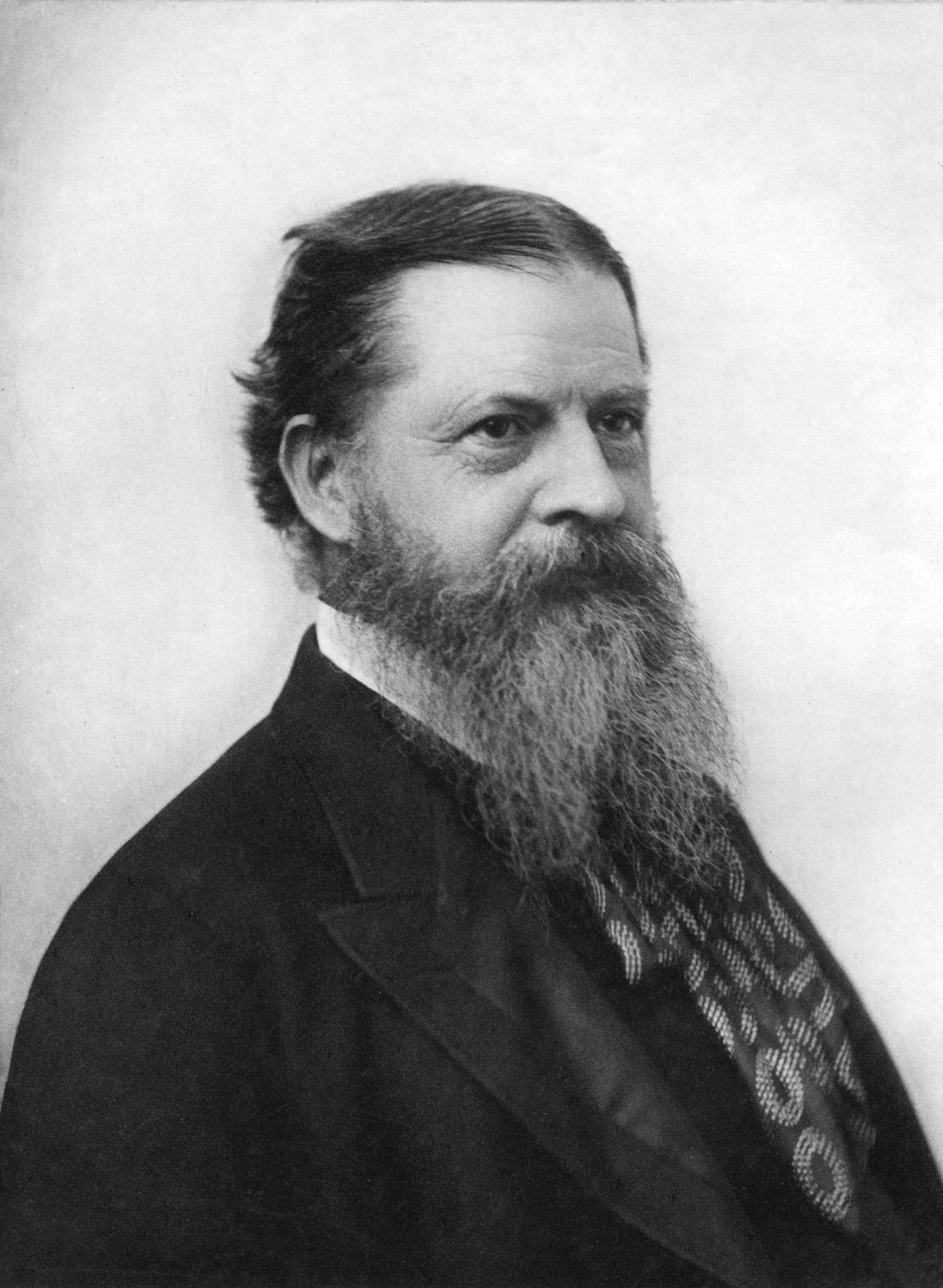
Charles Sanders Peirce argued for a scientific metaphysics and philosophy.

Scientific philosophy is the metaphilosophical view that all philosophy must be a discipline developed in continuity with science and developed as clearly as possible, even if necessary, sometimes also making use of formal tools (logical-mathematical). It is a way of philosophizing in which systematic philosophical theories (hypothetical-deductive systems) are developed on problems of various kinds, natural, social, etc. and in a very general range of problematization (of philosophical domain) in an exact way and with the help of the sciences available at the time, always being a revisable and criticizable project at all times.

The expression 'scientific philosophy' ("wissenschaftliche Philosophie") was first used by Hermann von Helmholtz in the mid-19th century (in 1855) in a lecture he gave in Königsberg. Its use was systematized with the philosophical and scientific work of the statistical physicist Ludwig Boltzmann at the end of the same century.
