= Visible-light astronomy =

Encompasses a wide variety of astronomical observation via telescopes

A diagram of the electromagnetic spectrum with the Earth's atmospheric transmittance (or opacity) and the types of telescopes used to image parts of the spectrum.

Visible-light astronomy encompasses a wide variety of astronomical observation via telescopes that are sensitive in the range of visible light (optical telescopes). Visible-light astronomy or optical astronomy differs from astronomies based on invisible types of light in the electromagnetic radiation spectrum, such as radio waves, infrared waves, ultraviolet waves, X-ray waves and gamma-ray waves. Visible light ranges from 380 to 750 nanometers in wavelength.

Visible-light astronomy has existed as long as people have been looking up at the night sky, although it has improved in its observational capabilities since the invention of the telescope. This is commonly credited to Hans Lippershey, a German-Dutch spectacle-maker, although Galileo Galilei played a large role in the development and creation of telescopes.

Since visible-light astronomy is restricted to only visible light, no equipment is necessary for simply star gazing. This makes it the most commonly participated in type of astronomy, as well as the oldest.

== History ==
=== Beginning ===
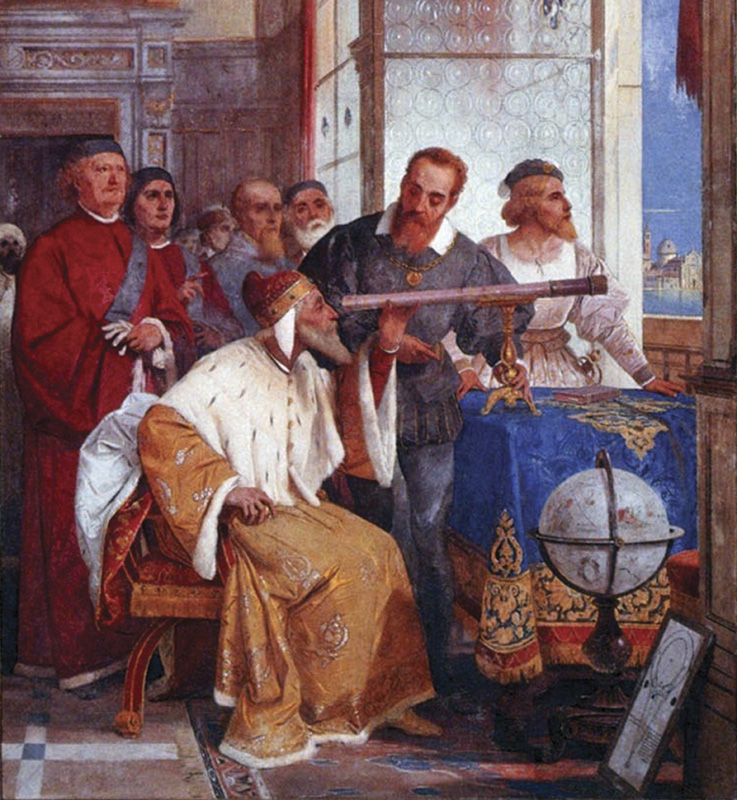
1858 fresco by Giuseppe Bertini depicting Galileo showing the Doge of Venice how to use the telescope

Before the advent of telescopes, astronomy was limited solely to unaided eyesight. Humans have been gazing at stars and other objects in the night sky for thousands of years, as is evident in the naming of many constellations, notably the largely Greek names used today.

Hans Lippershey, a German-Dutch spectacle maker, is commonly credited as being the first to invent the optical telescope. Lippershey is the first recorded person to apply for a patent for a telescope; however, it is unclear if Lippershey was the first to build a telescope. Based only on uncertain descriptions of the telescope for which Lippershey tried to obtain a patent, Galileo Galilei made a telescope with about 3× magnification in the following year. Galileo later made improved versions with up to 30× magnification. With a Galilean telescope, the observer could see magnified, upright images on Earth; it was what is commonly known as a terrestrial telescope or a spyglass. Galileo could also use it to observe the sky, and for a time was one of those who could construct telescopes good enough for that purpose. On 25 August 1609, Galileo demonstrated one of his early telescopes, with a magnification of up to 8 or 9, to Venetian lawmakers. Galileo's telescopes were also a profitable sideline, selling them to merchants who found them useful both at sea and as items of trade. He published his initial telescopic astronomical observations in March 1610 in a brief treatise titled Sidereus Nuncius (Starry Messenger).

The human eye, now with optical aid, remained the only image sensor until the advent of astrophotography in the 19th century.

=== Modern day ===
In the modern day, visible-light astronomy is still practiced by many amateur astronomers, especially since telescopes are much more widely available for the public, as compared to when they were first being invented. Government agencies, such as NASA, are very involved in the modern day research and observation of visible objects and celestial bodies. In the modern day, the highest quality pictures and data are obtained via space telescopes; telescopes that are outside of the Earth's atmosphere. This allows for much clearer observations, as the atmosphere is not disrupting the image and viewing quality of the telescope, meaning objects can be observed in much greater detail, and much more distant or low-light objects may be observed. Additionally, this means that observations are able to be made at any time, rather than only during the night.

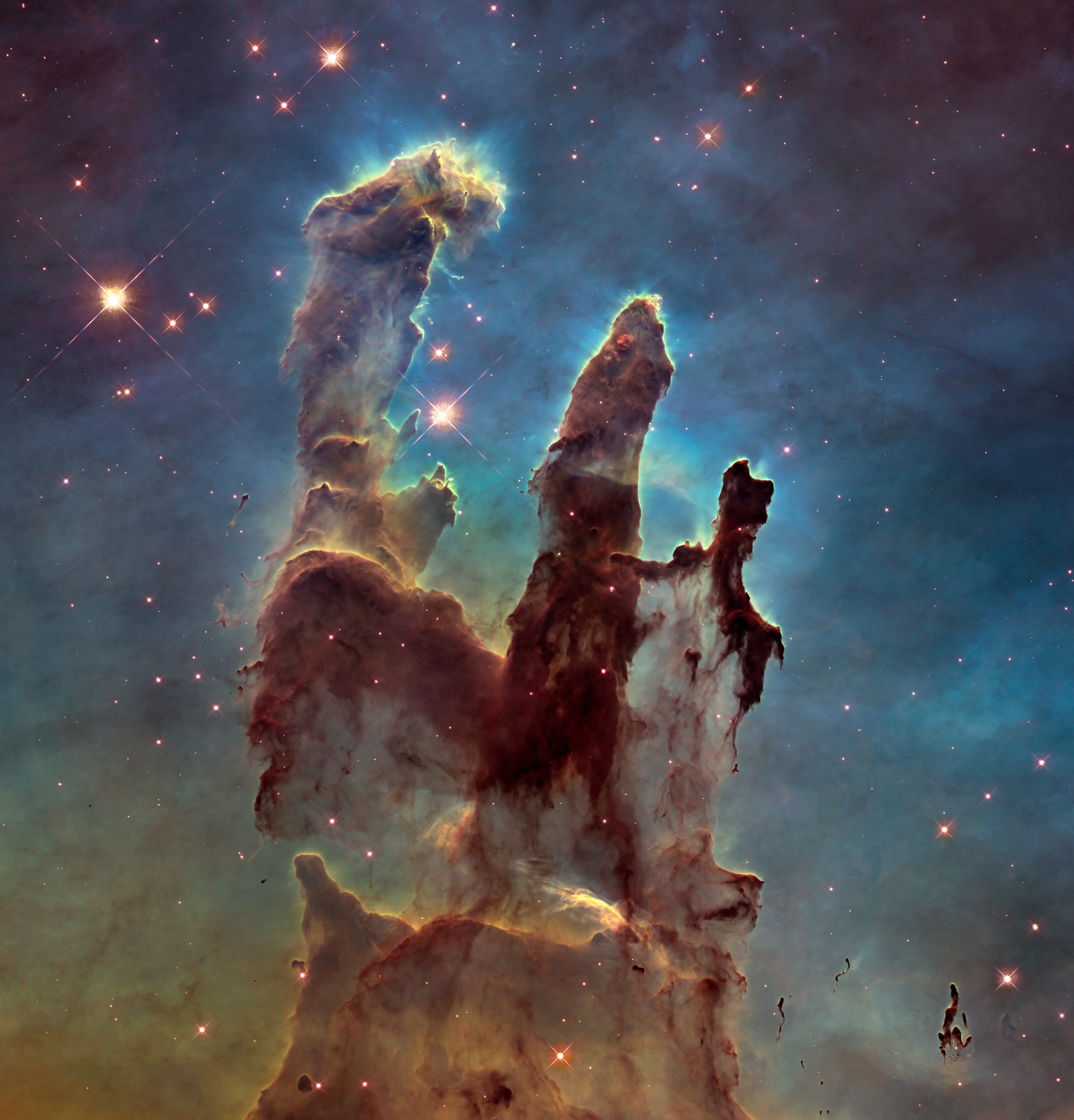
One of Hubble's most famous images, Pillars of Creation, shows stars forming in the Eagle Nebula (2014 image).

==== Hubble Space Telescope ====
The Hubble Space Telescope is a space telescope created by NASA, and was launched into low Earth orbit in 1990. It is still in operation today. The Hubble Space Telescope's four main instruments observe in the near ultraviolet, visible, and near infrared spectra. Hubble's images are some of the most detailed images ever taken, leading to many breakthroughs in astrophysics, such as accurately determining the rate of expansion of the universe.

== Optical telescopes ==
There are three main types of telescopes used in visible-light astronomy:

- Refracting telescopes, which use lenses to form the image. Commonly used by amateur astronomers, especially for viewing brighter objects such as the Moon, and planets, due to lower cost and ease of usage.
- Reflecting telescopes, which use mirrors to form the image. Commonly used for scientific purposes.
- Catadioptric telescopes, which use a combination of lenses and mirrors to form the image; essentially a combination of refracting and reflecting telescopes.

Each type of telescope suffers from different types of aberration; refracting telescopes have chromatic aberration, which causes colors to be shown on edges separating light and dark parts of the image, where there should not be such colors. This is due to the lens being unable to focus all colors to the same convergence point. Reflecting telescopes suffer from several types of optical inaccuracies, such as off-axis aberrations near the edges of the field of view. Catadioptric telescopes vary in the types of optical inaccuracies present, as there are numerous catadioptric telescope designs.

== Effect of ambient brightness ==
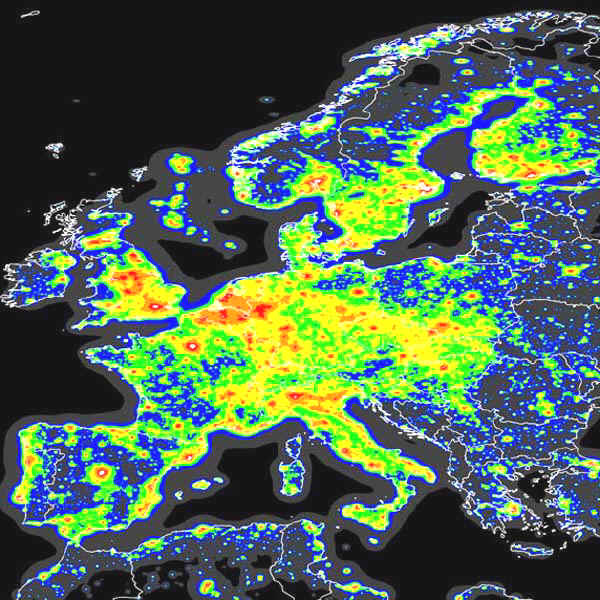
Light pollution map of Europe

The visibility of celestial objects in the night sky is affected by light pollution, with the presence of the Moon in the night sky historically hindering astronomical observation by increasing the amount of ambient lighting. With the advent of artificial light sources, however, light pollution has been a growing problem for viewing the night sky. Special filters and modifications to light fixtures can help to alleviate this problem, but for the best views, both professional and amateur optical astronomers seek viewing sites located far from major urban areas. In order to avoid light pollution of Earth's sky, among other reasons, many telescopes are put outside of the Earth's atmosphere, where not only light pollution, but also atmospheric distortion and obscuration are minimized.

== Commonly observed objects ==
The most commonly observed objects tend to be ones that do not require a telescope to view, such as the Moon, meteors, planets, constellations, and stars.

The Moon is a very commonly observed astronomical object, especially by amateur astronomers and skygazers. This is due to several reasons: the Moon is the brightest object in the night sky, the Moon is the largest object in the night sky, and the Moon has long been significant in many cultures, such as being the basis for many calendars. The Moon also does not require any kind of telescope or binoculars to see effectively, making it extremely convenient and common for people to observe.

Meteors, often called "shooting stars" are also commonly observed. Meteor showers, such as the Perseids and Leonids, make viewing meteors much easier, as a multitude of meteors are visible in a relatively short period of time.

Planets are usually observed with the aid of a telescope or binoculars. Venus is likely the easiest planet to observe without the aid of any instruments, as it is very bright, and can even be seen in daylight. However, Mars, Jupiter, and Saturn can also be seen without the aid of telescopes or binoculars.

Constellations and stars are also often observed, and have been used in the past for navigation, especially by ships at sea. One of the most recognizable constellations is the Big Dipper, which is part of the constellation Ursa Major. Constellations also serve to help describe the location of other objects in the sky.

== See also ==
- List of largest optical reflecting telescopes
- Optical telescope
- Astronomy
- Amateur astronomy
