= Casa =

Casa or CASA may refer to:

== Music ==
- B.U.G. Mafia prezintă CASA, 2002 album by Romanian hip hop group B.U.G. Mafia
- Casa (Morelenbaum²/Sakamoto album), 2001
- Casa (Natalia y La Forquetina album), 2005, or the title song
- Casa, a 2018 album by Carolina Deslandes

== Organizations ==
- We Are CASA, Latino and immigration advocacy-and-assistance organization
  - CASA v. Trump, a US Supreme Court case concerning EO 14160 and universal injunctions
- Casa Pia A.C., Portuguese athletic club
- Canadian Alliance of Student Associations
- Capital Area School for the Arts, Pennsylvania, US
- Centro de Acción Social Autónomo, center for immigrant and Chicano workers in San Francisco
- Church's Auxiliary for Social Action, New Delhi, India
- Court Appointed Special Advocates, a US association supporting court-appointed advocates for abused or neglected children
- CASA or Initiative Factory, Liverpool, on the UK Social Centre Network
- The National Center on Addiction and Substance Abuse at Columbia University, CASAColumbia, US
- Centre for Advanced Spatial Analysis, University College London, England
- Engineering Research Center for Collaborative Adaptive Sensing of the Atmosphere
- Contemporary A Cappella Society, a charitable organization dedicated to fostering and promoting a cappella music

=== Aviation ===
- EADS CASA, a Spanish aircraft manufacturer merged with Airbus Military in 2009
  - Construcciones Aeronáuticas SA (CASA), EADS CASA's predecessor
- Civil Aviation Safety Authority, the statutory authority responsible for the regulation of civil aviation in Australia

== Places ==
- Casa, Arkansas, United States
- Casablanca, Morocco, nicknamed "Casa"
- Casa de Tableta, Portola Valley, California, US

== Science and technology ==
- AIPS++/CASA (Common Astronomy Software Applications), image-processing software
- Cas A or Cassiopeia A, bright supernova remnant
- Chaperone-assisted selective autophagy, in biochemistry
- Chicago Air Shower Array, former high-energy astronomy facility
- Computational auditory scene analysis, machine listening
- Computer assisted semen analysis
- Computers are social actors, paradigm in psychology

== Other uses ==
- Casa (surname), list of people with the name
- Casa Condominio Residenza or The CASA, in Toronto, Canada
- Casa particular, "private house" or simply casa, accommodation in Cuba
- Casa (TV channel), a Canadian television channel
- CASA ratio (current and saving accounts)
- Casa 74, a condominium building in Upper East Side, Manhattan, New York City, US

== See also ==
- Kasa (disambiguation)
