= REBELS-25 =

Galaxy in the constellation Sextans

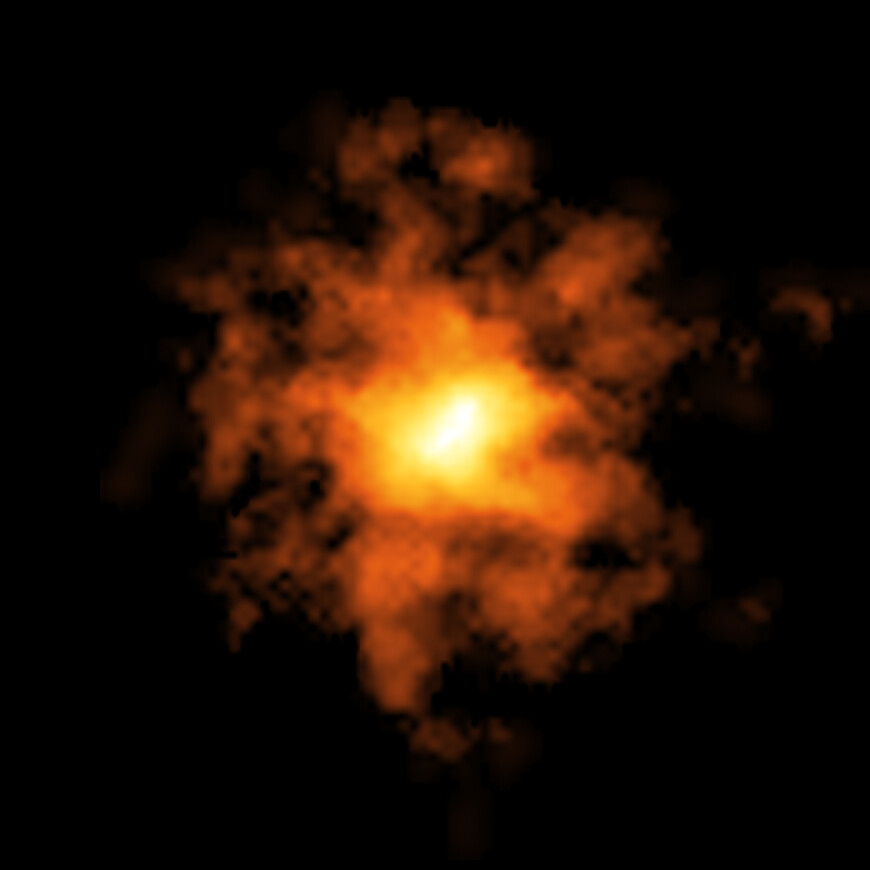
- REBELS-25 imaged by ALMA

Observation data (J2000 epoch)
- Constellation: Sextans
- Right ascension: 10^{h} 00^{m} 32.32^{s}
- Declination: +01° 44′ 31.22″
- Redshift: 7.31±0.0001
- Heliocentric radial velocity: 2,190,434 km/s (1,361,073 mi/s)
- Galactocentric velocity: 2,190,289 km/s (1,360,982 mi/s)
- Distance: 13 billion ly (4.0 billion pc) (light travel distance); 30 billion ly (9.2 billion pc) (comoving distance); 236 billion ly (72 billion pc) (luminosity distance)

Characteristics
- Mass: 8×10^{9} M_{☉}
- Size: 16 kly (4.9 kpc)

Other designations
- COSMOS2020 0336101, COSMOS2020 Farmer 499535, [SLB2017] UVISTA-Y-3, [BJD2020] UVISTA-0213

REBELS-25 is a massive, star-forming rotating disc galaxy with a redshift of 7.31. It was discovered using the Atacama Large Millimeter/submillimeter Array (ALMA), notice of its discovery was published in the Monthly Notices of the Royal Astronomical Society. REBELS-25 existed just 700 million years after the Big Bang. The discovery of such an ancient galaxy not only makes it the oldest known galaxy, but it is another piece of mounting evidence that suggests cosmologists need to revise their previous notions on galactic evolution.

REBELS-25 is very complex compared to what was expected for a galaxy of its age: researchers discovered that it rotates (with the help of blueshift and redshift), and also shows traces of spiral arms as "modern" galaxies, like the Milky Way, has. Lucie Rowland, lead author of the REBELS-25 discovery paper, said about this ancient galaxy that "Seeing a galaxy with such similarities to our own Milky Way, that is strongly rotation-dominated, challenges our understanding of how quickly galaxies in the early Universe evolve into the orderly galaxies of today's cosmos".
