= Sean Dougherty =

Sean Dougherty may refer to:

- Sean Dougherty (astrophysicist)
- Sean Dougherty (politician)

== See also ==
- Sean Doherty (disambiguation)
