= AIPS =

AIPS may refer to:

- Académie Internationale de Philosophie des Sciences
- Australian Institute of Public Safety
- Astronomical Image Processing System
- Association Internationale de la Presse Sportive (International Sports Press Association)
