= DG Tauri =

Star in constellation Taurus

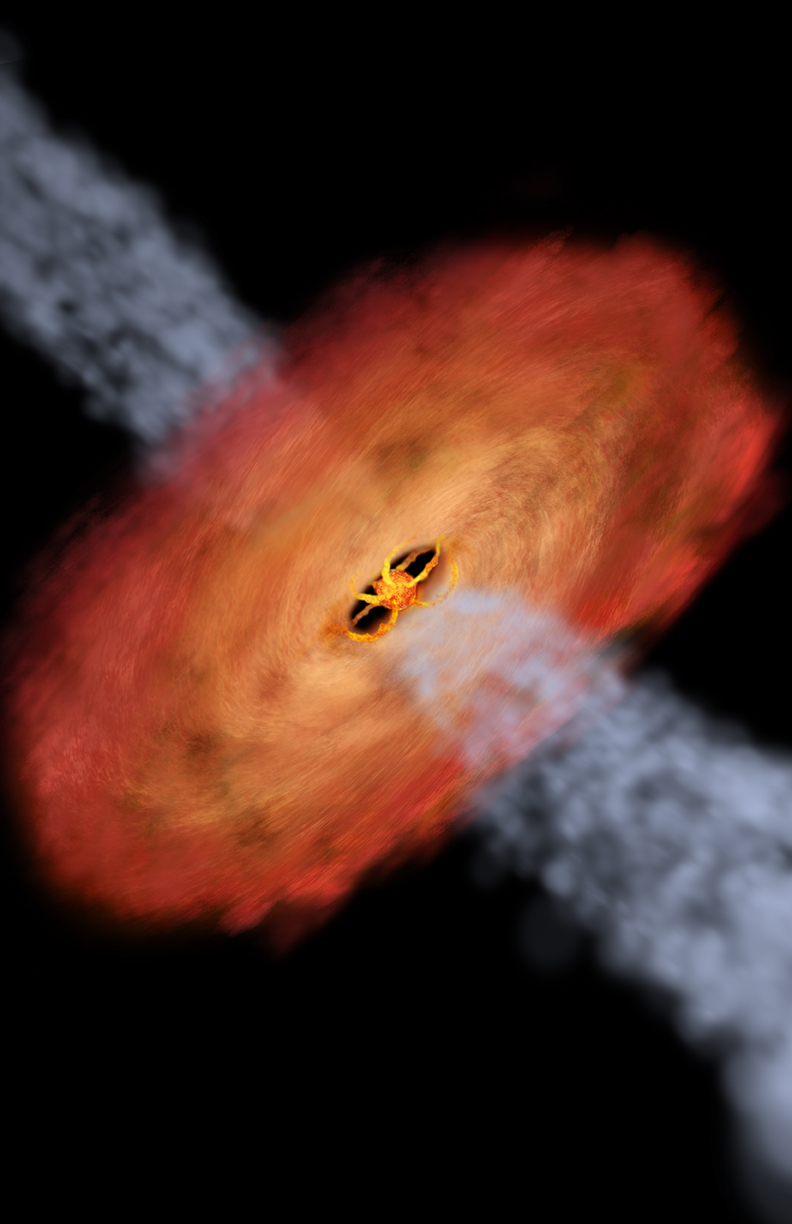
- An artist's conception of DG Tauri, showing the star, disk and jet.

Observation data Epoch J2000 Equinox J2000
- Constellation: Taurus
- Right ascension: 04^{h} 27^{m} 04.6921^{s}
- Declination: 26° 06′ 16.060″

Characteristics
- Spectral type: K7
- Variable type: T Tau

Astrometry
Radial velocity (R_{v})	5.5 km/s
Proper motion (μ)	RA: +5.514 mas/yr Dec.: −20.478 mas/yr
Parallax (π)	7.9836±0.1182 mas
Distance	409 ± 6 ly (125 ± 2 pc)

Details
Mass	0.70 M_{☉}
Radius	1.9 R_{☉}
Luminosity	0.26 L_{☉}
Surface gravity (log g)	3.20 cgs
Temperature	4,000 K
Metallicity [Fe/H]	−1.49 dex
Rotation	6.3 days
Rotational velocity (v sin i)	26.9 km/s
Age	1 Myr

Other designations
- 2MASS J04270469+2606163, IRAS 04240+2559, Gaia DR3 151262700852297728, TIC 268017134, AAVSO 0420+25B, HH 158

Database references
SIMBAD	data

DG Tauri is a young star about 400 light years from the Earth. It is a T Tauri-type variable star, ranging in brightness from magnitude 10.5 to 14.9 (in blue light), making it far too faint to be seen with the naked eye.

DG Tauri is located in the Taurus molecular cloud. The star is close enough to the ecliptic to be occasionally occulted by the Moon, and observations of those events have shown that DG Tauri is a single star, although it may be part of a wide binary with DG Tauri B.

The region around DG Tauri contains a variety of the structures associated with stars and planetary systems in the process of formation. In 1983, an optically visible jet extending up to 20 arc seconds (about 2500 AU) from the star was detected. The detection of continuum emission from a circumstellar disk was announced in 1989. In 2022 a study was published showing that a streamer of gas is accreting onto the circumstellar disk.

== Jet ==
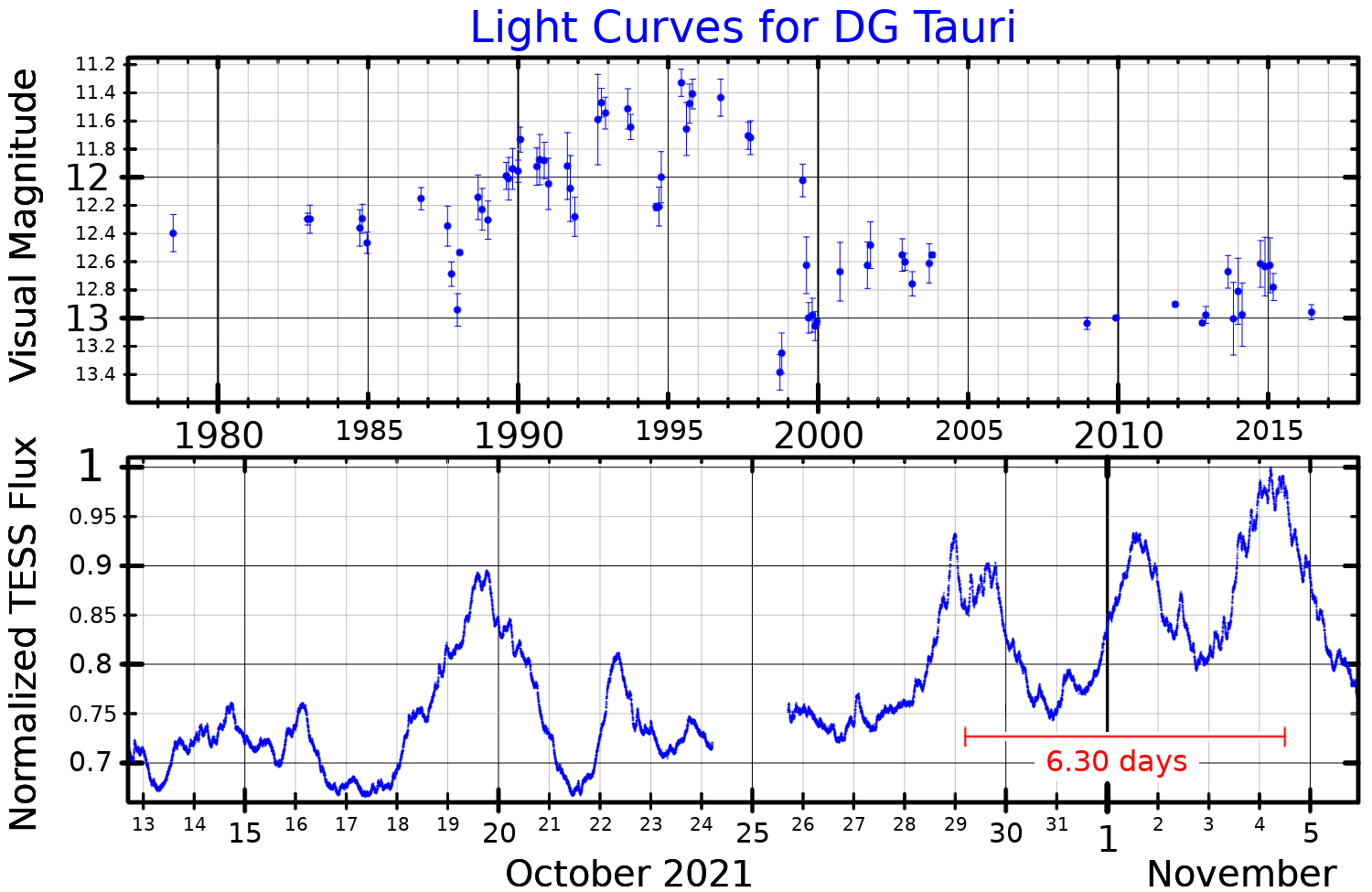
Light curves for DG Tauri. The upper panel, adapted from Pyo et al. (2024), shows the long term variability, and the lower panel, plotted from TESS data, shows the short term variability. The 6.30 day rotation period is marked in red.

The jet extending southwest (position angle ≈226°) from DG Tauri has been detected in X-rays, visible light, the infrared, and radio frequencies as low as 152 MHz. Its radiation is blue-shifted, indicating that the jet material is approaching us. It is inclined by about 38° to our line of sight. Density enhancements, or "knots", are seen in the jet, and their proper motions can be measured. They are ejected from very near the star, moving at hundreds of kilometers per second, and the ejection velocity is positively correlated with the brightness of the star; when the star brightens, the knots move away from the star faster. When the star is bright, the knots are ejected from a region about 0.06 AU from the star. When the star is dimmer, the knots are launched from regions further from the star. About (8±4)×10^{−9} M_{☉} of material is ejected in this blue-shifted jet each year.

A counter-jet (a red-shifted jet pointed in the direction opposite to the main jet) is seen in the Chandra X-ray image of the star.

== Disk ==
The disk surrounding DG Tau has a nearly flat SED across the near-, mid- and much of the far-infrared, making it a class I-II protostar. ALMA imaging of the disk shows it to be thin and smooth, with no substructures like the rings seen in HL Tauri or the spirals seen in HD 135344B. That suggests that planets have not yet formed. Combining the ALMA data from multiple frequencies allows the size of the dust grains to be estimated, if one adopts a model for grain emissivity. Using the DSHARP model results in an estimate of a typical grain size ranging from 400 microns in the inner 20 AU of the disk, increasing to >3 mm in the outer disk. Continuum emission from dust in the disk is detectable out to 80 AU from the star. At a distance of 30 AU from the star, the disk's scale height is only 0.8 AU.

Matter from the disk is accreting onto the star at a rate of about 1×10^{−7} M_{☉} per year. Most of the light coming from DG Tauri arises from the release of energy as this material falls upon the star.

== Streamer ==
DG Tauri is young enough that material from the star's natal cloud is still accreting onto the disk. The impact of such material hitting the disk can be detected by observing emission lines of sulfur-bearing molecules such as SO and SO_{2}, which are released when dust grains are destroyed by the shock at the point of impact. A "streamer" of such material has been detected. The streamer is a few hundred AU long, and is hitting the disk about 50 AU from the star.

== Possible planetary-mass companion ==
In 2017, it was found that the rogue planet or sub-brown dwarf designated KPNO-Tau 4 may be gravitationally associated to the DG Tauri system. If KPNO-Tau 4 is gravitationally associated to the system, it would orbit the star on a wide, long 66,000 astronomical unit orbit.

The DG Tauri planetary system
Companion (in order from star)	Mass	Semimajor axis (AU)	Orbital period (years)	Eccentricity	Inclination (°)	Radius
b	10 M_{J}	65,694	—	—	—	4.2 R_{J}
