= HL Tauri =

Star in constellation Taurus

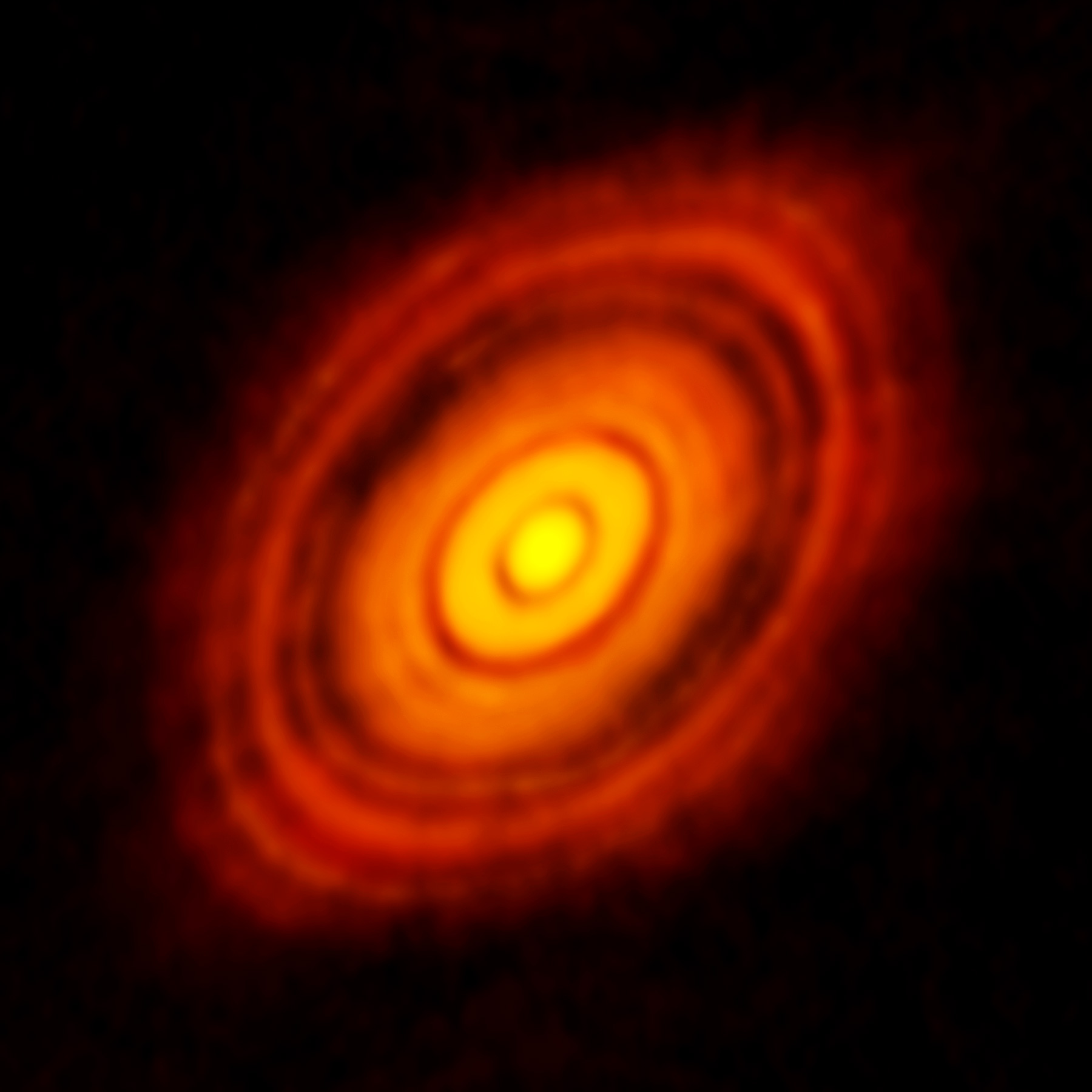
- Atacama Large Millimeter Array image of HL Tauri

Observation data Epoch J2000 Equinox ICRS
- Constellation: Taurus
- Right ascension: 04^{h} 31^{m} 38.437^{s}
- Declination: +18° 13′ 57.65″

Characteristics
- Evolutionary stage: Pre-main-sequence star
- Spectral type: Class K9
- Apparent magnitude (V): 15.1
- B−V color index: 0.92
- V−R color index: 0.89
- J−H color index: 1.45
- J−K color index: 3.21
- Variable type: T Tauri

Astrometry
Proper motion (μ)	RA: +8.0±6.0 mas/yr Dec.: -21.8±5.8 mas/yr
Distance	450 ly (140 pc)

Database references
SIMBAD	data

HL Tauri (abbreviated HL Tau) is a young T Tauri star in the constellation Taurus, approximately 450 light-years (140 pc) from Earth in the Taurus Molecular Cloud. The luminosity and effective temperature of HL Tauri imply that its age is less than 100,000 years. At apparent magnitude 15.1, it is too faint to be seen with the unaided eye. It is surrounded by a protoplanetary disk marked by dark bands visible in submillimeter radiation that may indicate a number of planets in the process of formation. It is accompanied by the Herbig–Haro object HH 150, a jet of gas emitted along the rotational axis of the disk that is colliding with nearby interstellar dust and gas.

== Protoplanetary disk ==
Indications of a protoplanetary disk were first presented in 1975 with infrared spectral observations in wavelengths between 2 and 4 microns, which were made possible by the recent invention of the indium antimonide photovoltaic detector. Of 29 very young stars examined, only HL Tauri showed a strong absorption feature centered on the expected 3.07 micron absorption of ice particles, which authors attributed to the ν_{1}, ν_{3}, and 2ν_{2} vibrational frequencies of the O–H bond. A 1982 survey identified HL Tauri as one of the most highly polarized T Tauri stars known, along with DG Tauri and V536 Aquilae.

A gas disk was discovered by interferometric observation of carbon monoxide (CO) emissions in 1986. Based on observation data in 1985 and 1986 from the Millimeter Wave Interferometer of the Owens Valley Radio Observatory, the circumstellar disk was estimated to have a mass between 0.01 M_{☉} and 0.5 M_{☉}, with a best fit of 0.1 M_{☉}, and a radius of about 200 AU. The temperature of the gas and grains of the disk are probably of the order of a few tens of kelvins. The gas was found to be bound to and in Keplerian rotation around a star with a mass of about 1 M_{☉}. Bipolar outflow of molecules such as carbon monoxide (CO) and diatomic hydrogen (H_{2}) have been observed. The element iron has also been noted in the outflow in its Fe(II) oxidation state, also called Fe^{2+} or ferrous iron.

An image of the protoplanetary disk made at submillimeter wavelengths by the Atacama Large Millimeter/submillimeter Array (ALMA) was made public in 2014, showing a series of concentric bright rings separated by gaps. The disk appeared much more evolved than would have been expected from the age of the system, which suggests that the planetary formation process may be faster than previously thought. ALMA's Catherine Vlahakis said, "When we first saw this image we were astounded at the spectacular level of detail. HL Tauri is no more than a million years old, yet already its disk appears to be full of forming planets. This one image alone will revolutionize theories of planet formation."

Stephens et al. (2014) suggest that the faster accretion rate might be due to the complex magnetic field of the protoplanetary disk.

In 2024, water was found within the protoplanetary disk using the Atacama Large Millimeter Array (ALMA), containing 3.7 Earth oceans worth of water vapour.

== Gallery ==
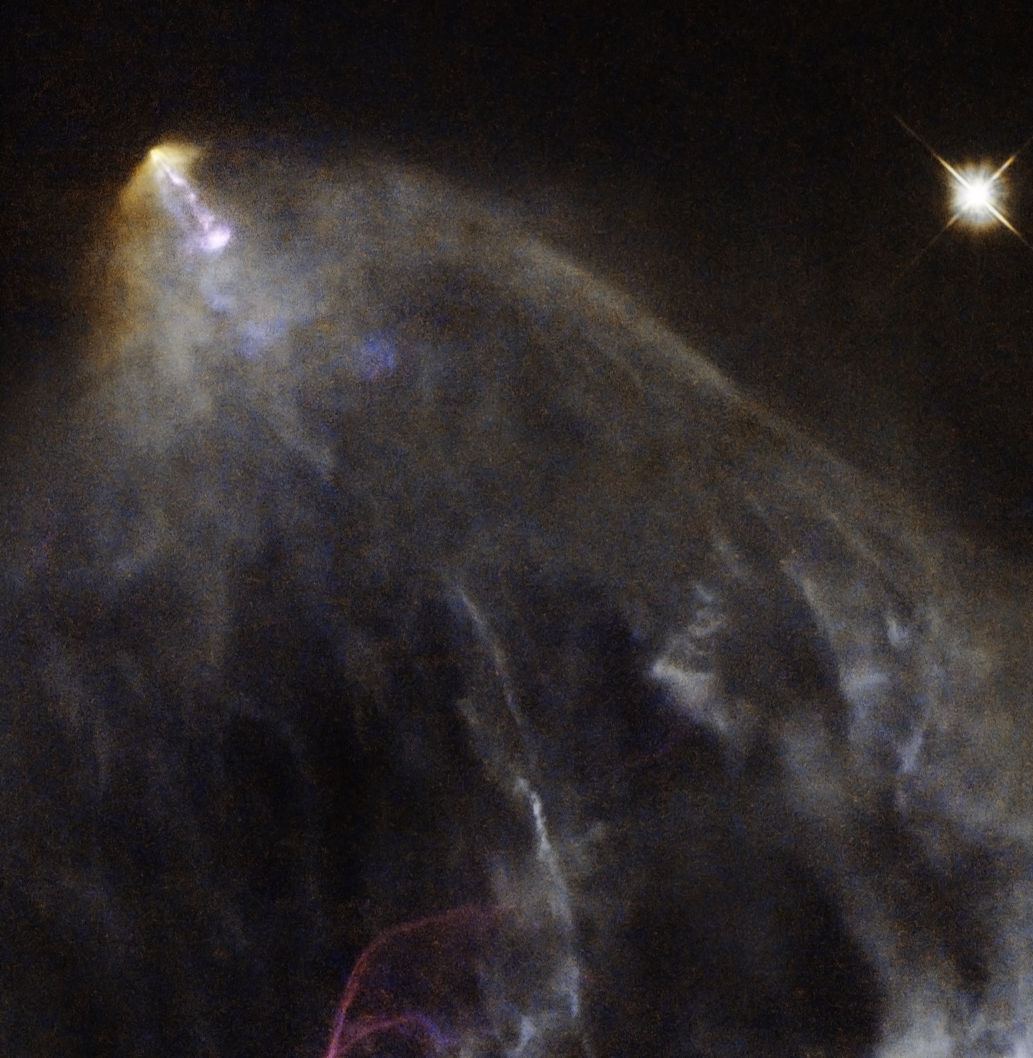
A wider view of the region (HL Tauri out of frame at bottom right corner) from the Hubble Space Telescope in visible light shows the Herbig–Haro object HH 150.

A broader view of the Taurus Molecular Cloud region. HL Tauri is shrouded in the bright blue region at upper center-left.

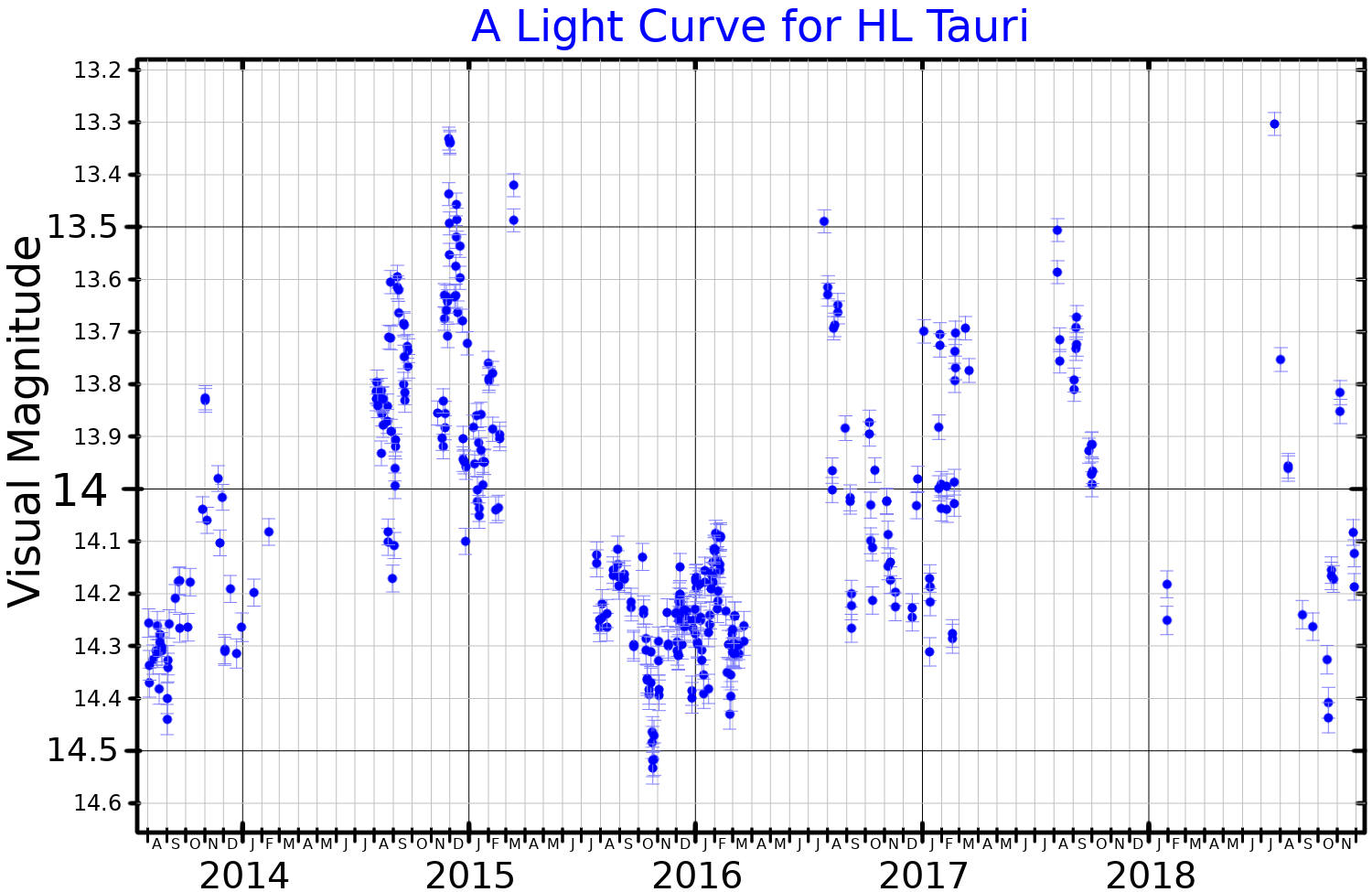
A visual band light curve for HL Tauri, plotted from ASAS-SN data

ALMA observations of water vapor in the HL Tauri disc
