= Astronomical Image Processing System =

Radio telescope data software package

AIPS
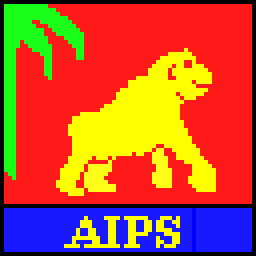

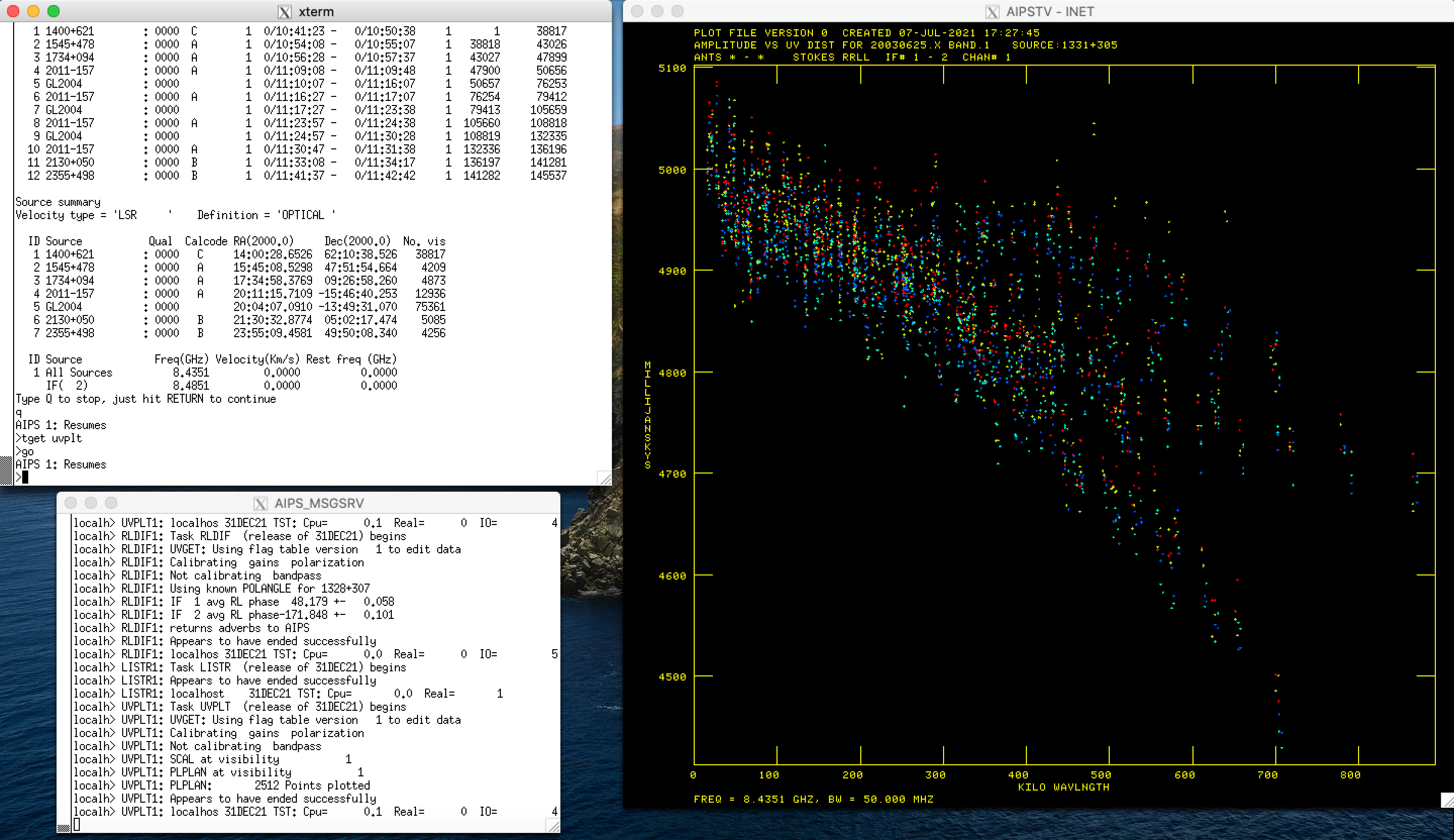
- AIPS 31DEC21 running on macOS
- Developer: NRAO
- Written in: FORTRAN and C
- Operating system: Unix-like
- Type: Astronomical Analysis
- License: GNU General Public License
- Website: http://www.aips.nrao.edu/index.shtml

The Astronomical Image Processing System (AIPS) is a software package to support the reduction and analysis of data taken with radio telescopes. Developed predominantly for use with the then under-construction VLA, the generality inherent in its design allowed it to become the standard data-reduction package for most radio interferometers, including VLBI. Limited single-dish capability is also featured. Although partially replaced by CASA, it continues to evolve and remains in use.

== History ==
Development of AIPS started at NRAO in 1978, two years before the VLA became fully operational. Originally written in FORTRAN 66, AIPS has used FORTRAN 77 since 1989. The very first AIPS installation was on a MODCOMP computer, but the package's portability has led to it being installed on many different systems. Pre-compiled versions are today available for users of Linux and Mac OS. Since 2018, a pre-compiled version is no longer available for Solaris and users must now build AIPS from source.

Over the years, the capabilities of AIPS have greatly expanded. Initial usage was focused on the VLA, but it has gone on to be used to reduce data from practically all radio interferometers, including MERLIN and the GMRT and, to a lesser extent, the WSRT and ATCA. The ability to calibrate VLBI data (including space VLBI) was added in the 1990s, primarily to support operations with the VLBA, but in the process becoming the main data-reduction package for the EVN and combined VLBA/EVN observations (Global VLBI). Single-dish support was also added in the 1980s, with particular application to NRAO's 12-m radio telescope and the 91-m transit telescope.

AIPS has now been in use for nearly 40 years and has even outlived its supposed replacement AIPS++, which was eventually rebranded as CASA. CASA has gone on to be the main data-reduction package for the upgraded VLA (EVLA) and ALMA, but AIPS remains able, to a large degree, to process data from these state-of-the-art instruments. Despite its age and limited resources, AIPS remains used and under active development. AIPS is free software and is covered by the terms of the GNU General Public License.

== Description ==
AIPS runs under the X Window System with commands entered interactively using a command-line interpreter called POPS. Although relatively primitive, this gives access to a useful collection of e.g. mathematical functions, logical operators and flow control statements. Commands can also be placed in a text file which makes repeating complicated procedures much more convenient and which can be used to create data-reduction pipelines. A more modern alternative is to install ParselTongue, a Python-based interface.

As well as the terminal window from which AIPS is started and commands entered, most AIPS sessions will by default contain two other windows, the AIPS TV and the Message Server. The TV is used to visualise data or images and can, for example, be used to interactively edit data or control the progress of a deconvolution. The Message Server displays useful information reported by each task. Optionally, basic black and white plots can be displayed using TEKSRV, a Tektronix 4012-based graphics terminal.

Before any data can be processed by AIPS, they must first be imported into the system's own data areas, usually in FITS format. The FITS standard was agreed in 1979 and its development is inseparable from that of AIPS. The data can henceforth be processed using a large number (>530) of individual programs, each of which performs a specific task e.g. producing an image from a calibrated data set. Together these allow a user to visualize, edit and calibrate a data set and subsequently make images or fit models. A number of analysis tasks are included (e.g. Gaussian fitting to images or spectra) as well as the possibility to make publication-quality plots.

Extensive help is available to AIPS users, with detailed information on each parameter and task viewable from the command line. There is also a user guide, the AIPS Cookbook, which is built around examples (recipes) of how to run the various tasks. It is available on-line, as well as being packaged with AIPS in PDF and PostScript formats. A newsletter (AIPSLetter) is published biannually.

== Primatology ==
Although briefly known as RANCID, the eventual choice of name has led to a preponderance of primate-based humour in and around AIPS. The Cookbook contains "additional recipes", instructions for preparing food and drink which all feature bananas as an ingredient. The programmer's guide is called Going AIPS, the cover of which features a gorilla clutching a Tektronix 4012 graphics terminal whilst standing upon two IBM 3420 Magnetic Tape Units. Various cover designs of the Cookbook and icons also include images of primates.

== See also ==
- IRAF - package for processing data from optical telescopes
- Starlink - package similar to IRAF, but developed for UK astronomers
