= SPT2349-56 =

Galaxy protocluster in the constellation Phoenix

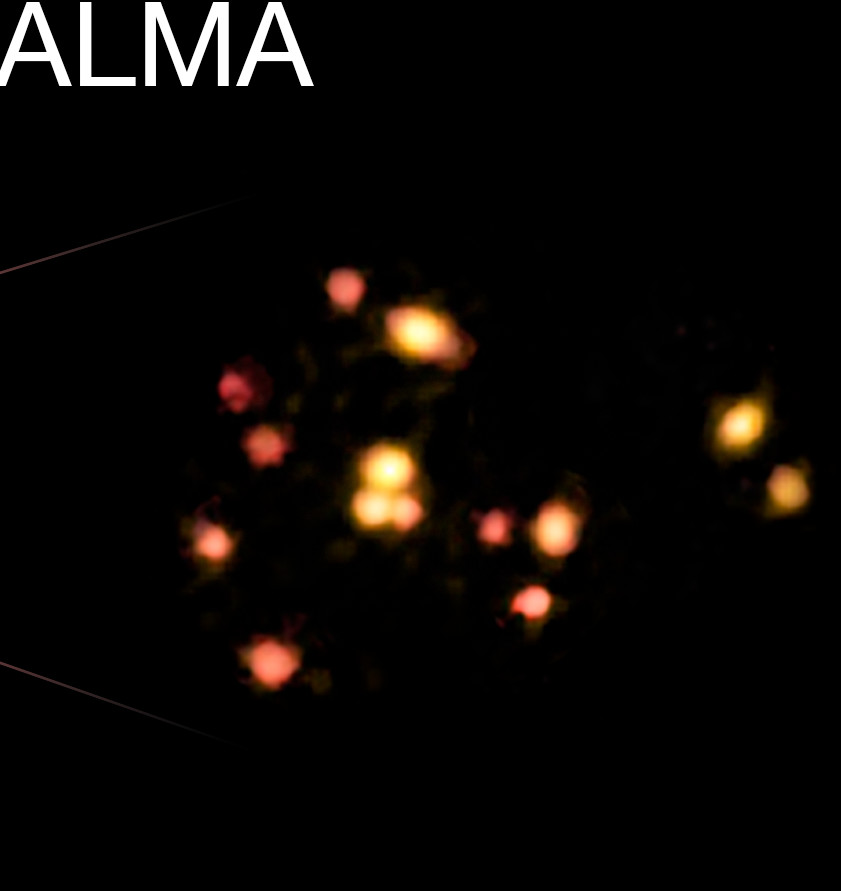
- SPT2349-56 imaged by the Atacama Large Millimeter Array showing 14 merging galaxies.

Observation data (Epoch J2000)
- Constellation: Phoenix
- Right ascension: 23^{h} 49^{m} 48^{s}
- Declination: −56° 37′ 40″
- Number of galaxies: 30
- Redshift: 4.3
- Distance: 12 billion light years (light travel distance)

SPT2349-56 is the brightest galaxy protocluster candidate discovered by the South Pole Telescope survey. It appears as (when observed as it was 12 billion years ago) essentially hot plasma gas and new galaxies forming into a cluster. It was discovered by astronomers at the Atacama Large Millimeter Array in northern Chile. Astronomers have observed the intense formation of stars as well as super-massive black holes.

== Description ==
=== Structure ===
This protocluster (a cluster yet to be completely bound by gravitation) appears to contain an intracluster medium of hot gas, and over 30 galaxies grouped together, into the relatively small space of only 500,000 light-years across. This is about the same size of the halo of dark matter and ancient stars that surrounds the Milky Way galaxy. Within the galaxies of SPT2349-56, stars are forming 5,000x faster than in the Milky Way.

=== Temperature ===
When measured indirectly using the Sunyaev–Zeldovich effect, the intracluster medium was found to be at least 5x hotter than expected. Compared to newer clusters, it is hotter and more energetic.

Models suggest that galaxy clusters form by the dynamical collapse of the galaxies, entering a gravitationally bound state that is stable. During this process, the intracluster medium becomes heated. As SPT2349-56 is a protocluster, it should not yet be as hot as it is. This suggests to astronomers that models of how galaxy clusters develop is not complete.

== See also ==
- Farthest protoclusters
- Protogalaxy
