= DG Tauri B =

Star in the constellation Taurus

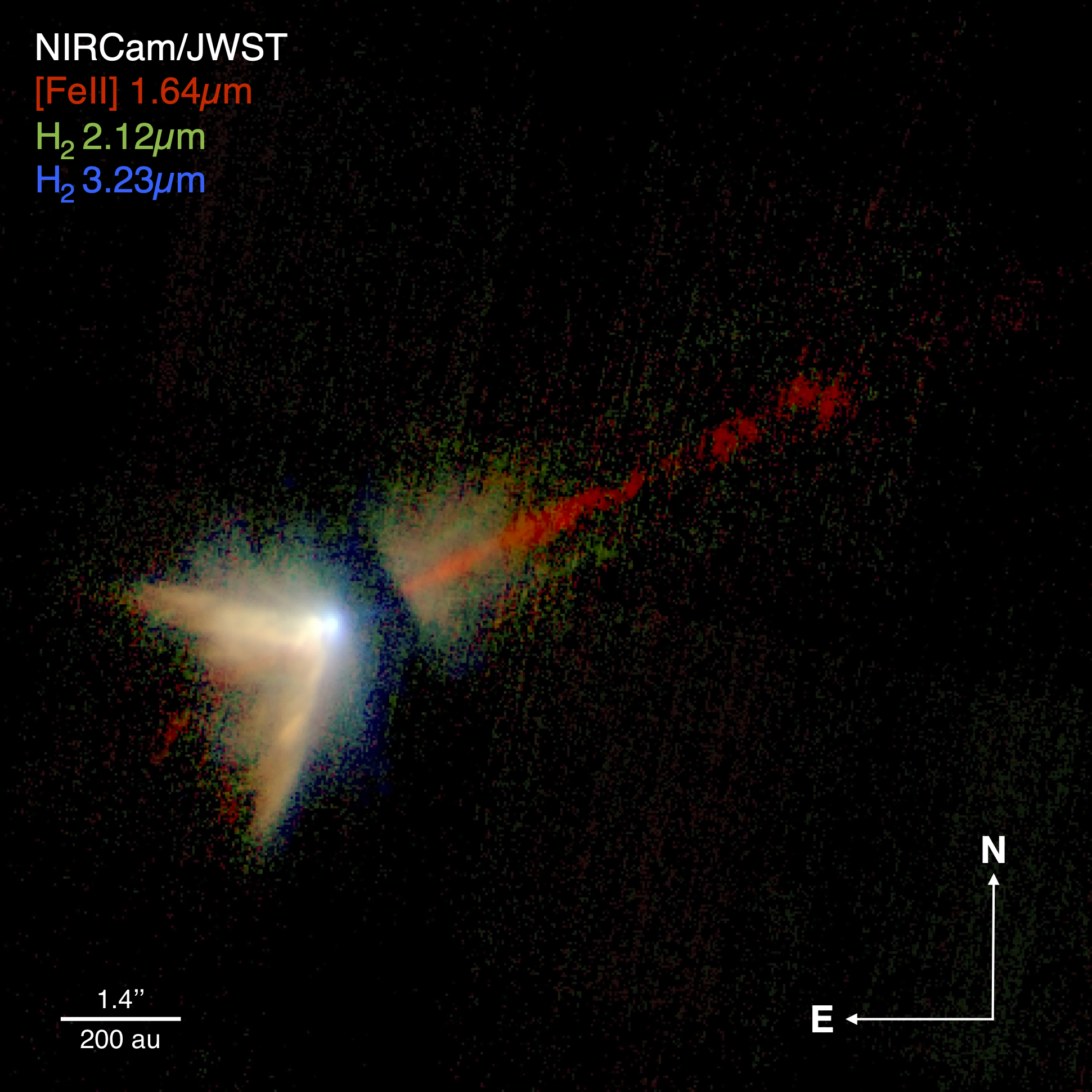
- Image of DG Tau B obtained with the James Webb Space Telescope combining the F164N, F212N and F323N filters. Credit: NASA, ESA, CSA, STSci, Delabrosse et al. 2024.

Observation data Epoch J2000 Equinox ICRS
- Constellation: Taurus
- Right ascension: 04^{h} 27^{m} 02.661^{s}
- Declination: +26° 05′ 30.45″

Other designations
- 2MASS J04270266+2605304

Database references
| SIMBAD | data |

DG Tauri B is a young stellar object located 450 light-years (140 parsecs) from Earth, near the T Tauri star DG Tauri, within the constellation Taurus. Observations of DG Tauri B were first made in October, and later December 1995 at the 6 element Owens Valley millimeter wave array. Its most notable characteristics are its bipolar jets of molecular gas and dust emanating from either side of the object. Red-shifted carbon monoxide emissions extend out 6,000 AU to the northwest of the object from the undetermined source, and are symmetrically distributed about the jet, while blue-shifted CO emissions are confined to a region with a roughly 500 AU radius.
