= Casa (surname) =

Casa is a surname. Notable people with the surname include:

- Christophe Casa (born 1957), French professional tennis player
- David Casa (born 1968), Maltese politician and Member of the European Parliament
- Giovanni della Casa (1503 – 1556), Florentine poet, writer on etiquette and society, diplomat, and inquisitor

== See also ==
- Casa (disambiguation)
- Casas (surname)
