= ALESS 073.1 =

Galaxy discovered in 2021

Observation data (J2000 epoch)
- Constellation: Fornax
- Right ascension: 03^{h} 32^{m} 29.9^{s}
- Declination: −27° 56′ 19.3″
- Redshift: 4.7555±0.0001
- Heliocentric radial velocity: 1,425,663 km/s (885,866 mi/s)
- Galactocentric velocity: 1,425,561 km/s (885,803 mi/s)
- Distance: ~12.5 billion ly (3.8 billion pc) (light travel distance); 25 billion ly (7.7 billion pc) (comoving distance)
- Apparent magnitude (V): 25.5

Characteristics
- Type: Spiral galaxy, submilimeter galaxy

Other designations
- GDS J033229.29−275619.5, HKS2013 ALESS 073.1, COMBO-17 16177, XLB2011 403

ALESS 073.1 is an old spiral and submilimeter galaxy located in the constellation Fornax 12 billion light years away from Earth. The discovery was published in February 2021 in the journal Science. It has challenged the way astronomers understand galaxies and galaxy formation.

== Observation ==
The galaxy was reported in a study conducted by a team of astronomers led by Dr. Federico Lelli at Cardiff University. The team used the Atacama Large Millimeter/submillimeter Array (ALMA) telescope, currently the largest radio telescope in the world, to observe the galaxy in its adolescence. The publication of the study of ALESS 073.1 includes "one of the sharpest, direct images of a primordial galaxy ever produced, which allowed the team to undertake a detailed study of its internal structure", according to Cardiff University.

== Distance ==
ALESS 073.1 is about 12 billion light years away from Earth. Due to its distance away from Earth, the light being shown is from when the universe was only 10% of its current age.

== Characteristics ==
Like all galaxies, ALESS 073.1 is composed of gas, dark matter, and dust. It is made from stars that are held together by gravity.

ALESS 073.1 is estimated to have formed 12 billion years ago, just 1.2 billion years after the Big Bang. The image of the galaxy seen now gives an image of it during its early years. However, the physical characteristics of the galaxy indicate that the galaxy is much older than its features indicate. ALESS 073.1 exhibits features normally attributed to mature galaxies, such as spiral arms that extend from its center. In this way, it has similar features to spiral galaxies. It also has a rotating disk and a bulge, characteristics found in mature galaxies. This is contrary to the previous understanding of newer galaxies being chaotic, without a particular shape or structure. Over billions of years, young galaxies slow down and stabilize. This creates the distinctive features that are associated with mature galaxies.

The core of ALESS 073.1 hints at the presence of a supermassive black hole, since it is producing more energy than is typical for stars.

== Scientific implications ==
The galaxy's young features, while displaying mature features, challenges scientists’ understanding of galaxy formation. However, more images and information are needed to indicate if this can be observed from other galaxies.

The massive bulge of ALESS 073.1 also puts features typically associated with mature galaxies into question. A bulge is a group of stars that are clustered together at the center of the galaxy. Bulges were generally thought to be a prominent feature of mature galaxies. It was thought that these bulges formed slowly over a long period of time through the merging of smaller galaxies. However, the discovery of ALESS 073.1's bulge indicates that they are able to be formed much quicker than previously thought. Approximately half of ALESS 073.1's stars were found to be present in the bulge.
