= Sean Dougherty (astrophysicist) =

Canadian astrophysicist

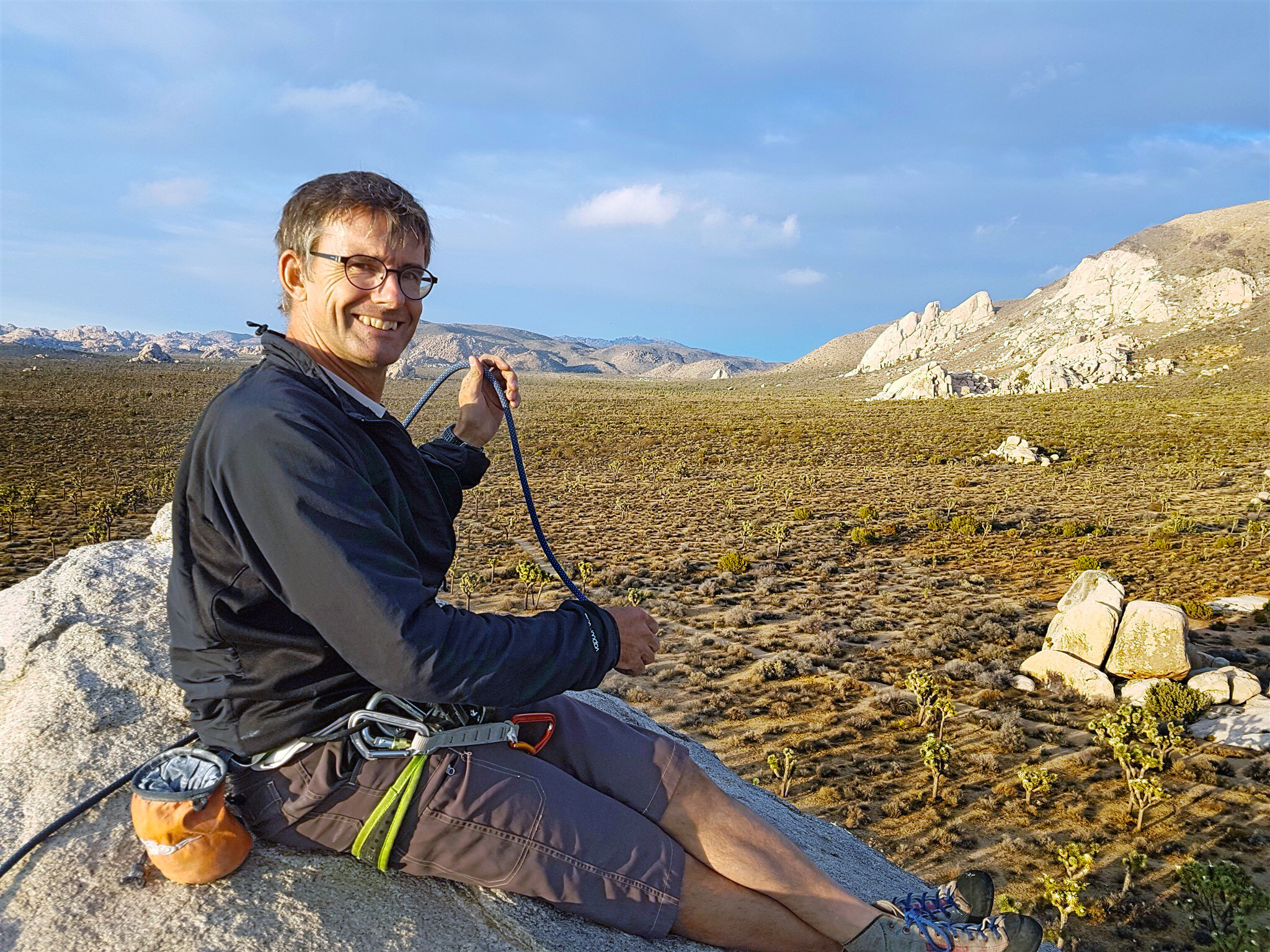
- Image of Sean Dougherty in climbing gear circa 2017
- Occupation: astrophysicist

Sean Dougherty is a Canadian astrophysicist who has been involved in a large number of radio astronomical facilities, both Canadian and international.

Dougherty obtained a degree in mathematics and physics from the University of Nottingham in 1983, and after that he pursued a doctorate in astrophysics at the University of Calgary, where he obtained his Ph.D. in 1993.

Dougherty has more than 20 years of expertise in radio astronomy, managing and representing Canadian contributions to international radio astronomical facilities, and also research and development projects.

Dougherty has also led the construction and delivery of the WIDAR correlator to the Karl G. Jansky Very Large Array (JVLA). He also led an international consortium that designed the correlator (Central Signal Processor) of the Square Kilometre Array (SKA) Phase 1 mid-frequency telescope (SKA1-Mid).

Dougherty was selected for the position of ALMA Director in July 2017 for a five year period, starting February 21, 2018. In January 2023, his term as ALMA Director was extended an additional 5 years, February 2023 - January 2028.

Dougherty was previously the director of the Dominion Radio Astrophysical Observatory (DRAO), the national facility for radio astronomy in Canada. DRAO is administrated by the NRC Herzberg Astronomy and Astrophysics. He was a member of the ALMA Board representing the North American executive for four years, and has been the president for the ALMA Budget Committee for two years.

Dougherty initiated the efforts for the establishment of the ALMA 2030 Roadmap, which resulted in the launch of the Wideband Sensitivity Upgrade, the first large update of the facility since the inauguration of ALMA in March 2013.

Dougherty has more than 180 publications as of January 2024, of which around 85 are refereed.
