= CASA ratio =

Current and savings account ratio

CASA ratio stands for current and savings account ratio. CASA ratio of a bank is the ratio of deposits in current, and saving accounts to total deposits. A higher CASA ratio indicates a lower cost of funds, because banks do not usually give any interests on current account deposits and the interest on saving accounts is usually very low 3–4%. If a large part of a bank's deposits comes from these funds, it means that the bank is getting those funds at a relative lower cost. It is generally understood that a higher CASA ratio leads to higher net interest margin. In India, it is used as one of the metrics to assess the profitability of a bank.

== Formula ==
${CASA Ratio} = \left ( \frac{CASA Deposit}{Total Deposits plus CASA} \right )$

== CASA ratio of some Indian banks ==
CASA ratio of select banks
Bank	CASA Ratio	Date
SBI	43.81%	2017
Yes Bank	26%	2020
Kotak Mahindra Bank	51%	March 2018
ICICI Bank	51%	January 2019
Karnataka Bank	28.91%	March 2020
IndusInd Bank	42.00%	March 2021

== See also ==
- Banking in India
