= CHIRP (algorithm) =

Algorithm used for image processing

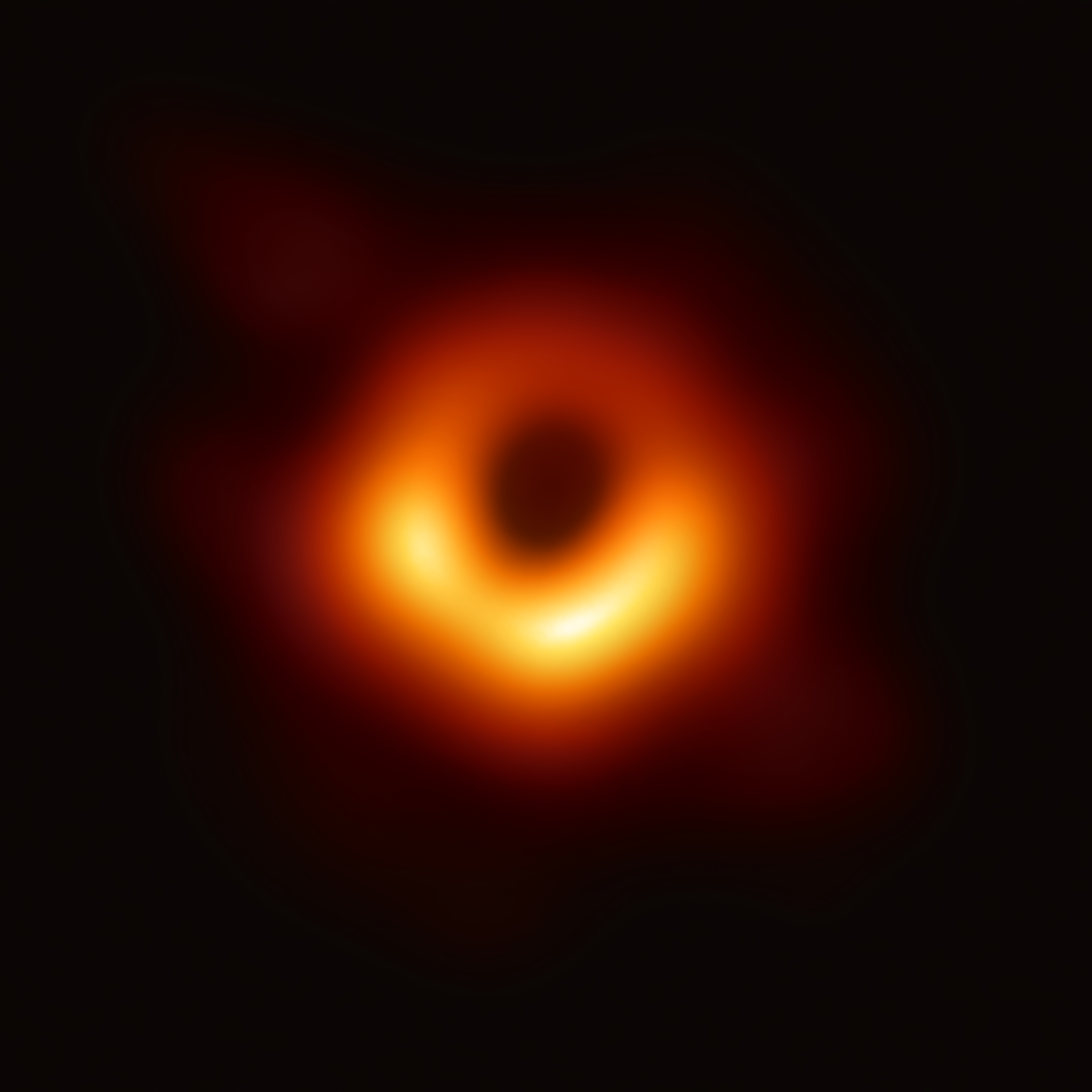
First combined image reconstruction of the event horizon of a black hole (M87*) captured by the Event Horizon Telescope.

CHIRP (Continuous High-resolution Image Reconstruction using Patch priors) is a Bayesian algorithm used to perform a deconvolution on images created in radio astronomy. The acronym was coined by lead author Katherine L. Bouman in 2016.

The development of CHIRP involved a large team of researchers from MIT's Computer Science and Artificial Intelligence Laboratory, the Center for Astrophysics | Harvard & Smithsonian and the MIT Haystack Observatory, including Bill Freeman and Sheperd Doeleman. It was first presented publicly by Bouman at the IEEE Computer Vision and Pattern Recognition conference in June 2016.

== Development ==
The CHIRP algorithm was developed to process data collected by the very-long-baseline Event Horizon Telescope, the international collaboration that in 2019 captured the black hole image of M87* for the first time. CHIRP was not used to produce the image, but was an algebraic solution for the extraction of information from radio signals producing data by an array of radio telescopes scattered around the globe. Stable sources (that don't change over short periods of time) can also gain signal by integrating the change at each location with the rotation of the earth. Because the radio telescopes used in the project produce vast amounts of data, which contain gaps, the CHIRP algorithm is one of the ways to fill the gaps in the collected data.

== Evaluation ==
For reconstruction of such images which have sparse frequency measurements the CHIRP algorithm tends to outperform CLEAN, BSMEM (BiSpectrum Maximum Entropy Method), and SQUEEZE, especially for datasets with lower signal-to-noise ratios and for reconstructing images of extended sources. While the BSMEM and SQUEEZE algorithms may perform better with hand-tuned parameters, tests show CHIRP can do better with less user expertise.

== See also ==
- Van Cittert–Zernike theorem § Aperture synthesis
