= Event Horizon Telescope =

Global radio telescope array

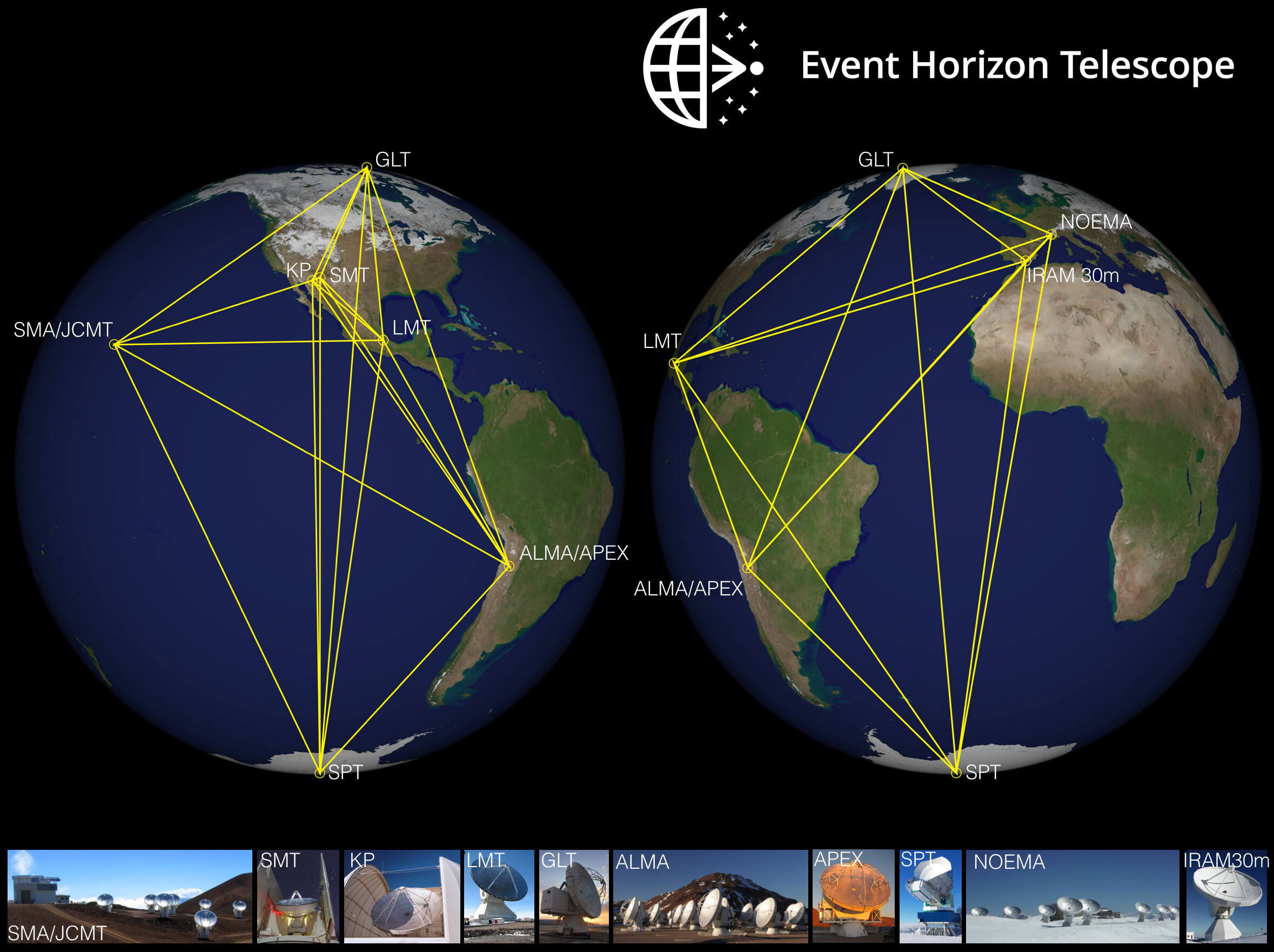
- Alternative names: EHT
- Established: 2009; 17 years ago
- Website: eventhorizontelescope.org
- Telescopes: Atacama Large Millimeter Array; Atacama Pathfinder Experiment; Greenland Telescope; Heinrich Hertz Submillimeter Telescope; IRAM 30m telescope; James Clerk Maxwell Telescope; Large Millimeter Telescope; South Pole Telescope; Submillimeter Array
- Related media on Commons

The Event Horizon Telescope (EHT) is a telescope array consisting of a global network of radio telescopes. The EHT project combines data from several very-long-baseline interferometry (VLBI) stations around Earth, which form a combined array with an angular resolution sufficient to observe objects the size of a supermassive black hole's event horizon. The project's observational targets include the two black holes with the largest angular diameter as observed from Earth: the black hole at the center of the supergiant elliptical galaxy Messier 87, and Sagittarius A*, at the center of the Milky Way.

The Event Horizon Telescope project is an international collaboration that was launched in 2009 after a long period of theoretical and technical developments. On the theory side, work on the photon orbit and first simulations of what a black hole would look like progressed to predictions of VLBI imaging for the Galactic Center black hole, Sgr A*. Technical advances in radio observing moved from the first detection of Sgr A*, through VLBI at progressively shorter wavelengths, ultimately leading to detection of horizon scale structure in both Sgr A* and M87. The collaboration now comprises over 300 members, and 60 institutions, working in over 20 countries and regions.

The first image of a black hole, at the center of galaxy Messier 87, was published by the EHT Collaboration on April 10, 2019, in a series of six scientific publications. The array made this observation at a wavelength of 1.3 mm and with a theoretical diffraction-limited resolution of 25 microarcseconds. In March 2021, the Collaboration presented, for the first time, a polarized-based image of the black hole which may help better reveal the forces giving rise to quasars. Future plans involve improving the array's resolution by adding new telescopes and by taking shorter-wavelength observations. On 12 May 2022, astronomers unveiled the first image of the supermassive black hole at the center of the Milky Way, Sagittarius A*. Since 2018 the EHT has been capable of imaging at a wavelength of 870 μm (345 GHz), giving an angular resolution of 19 μas, the best resolution of any ground-based telescope.

== Telescope array ==
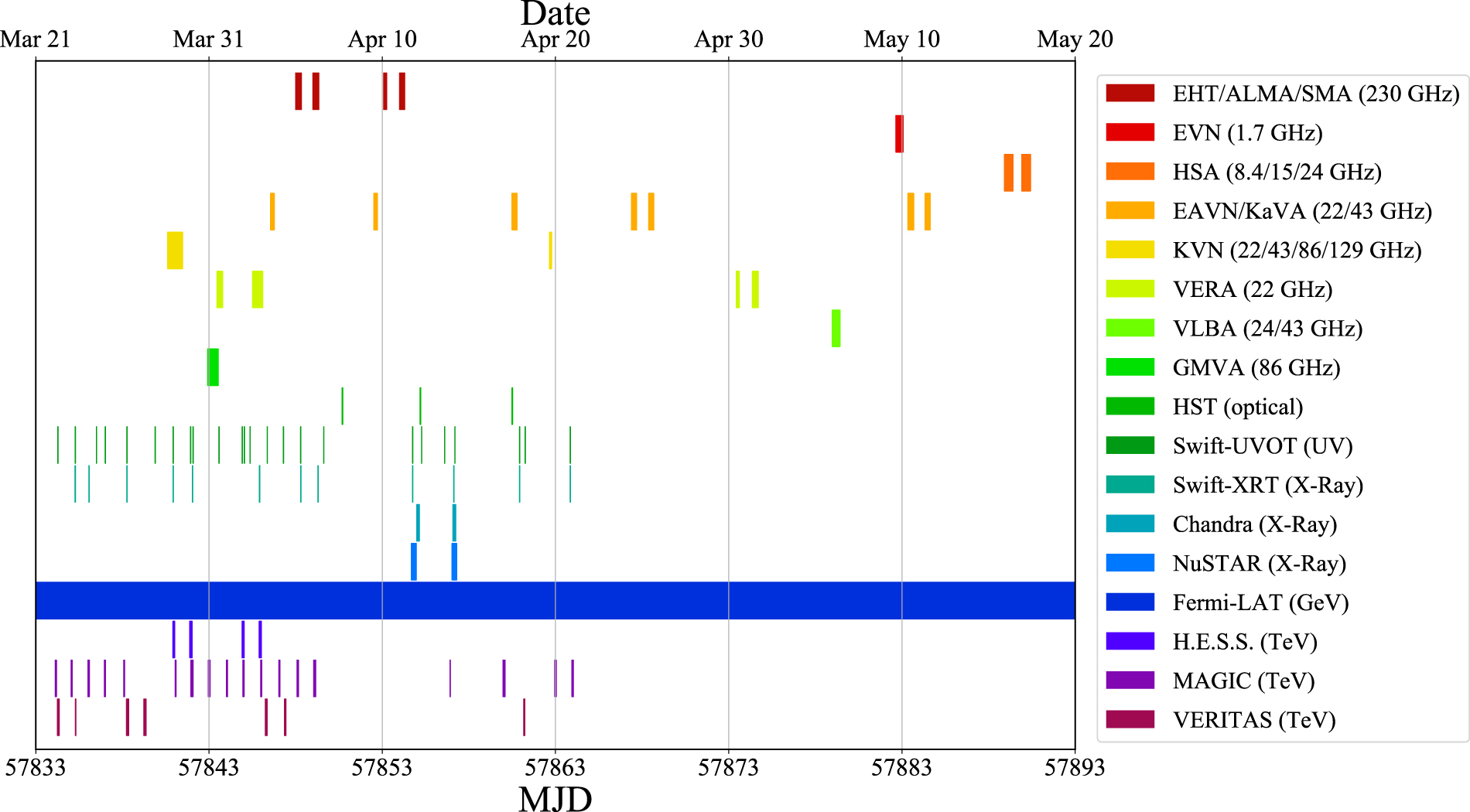
EHT observations during its 2017 M87 multiwavelength campaign decomposed by instrument from lower (EHT/ALMA/SMA) to higher (VERITAS) frequency (Fermi-LAT in continuous survey mode) (dates also in Modified Julian days)

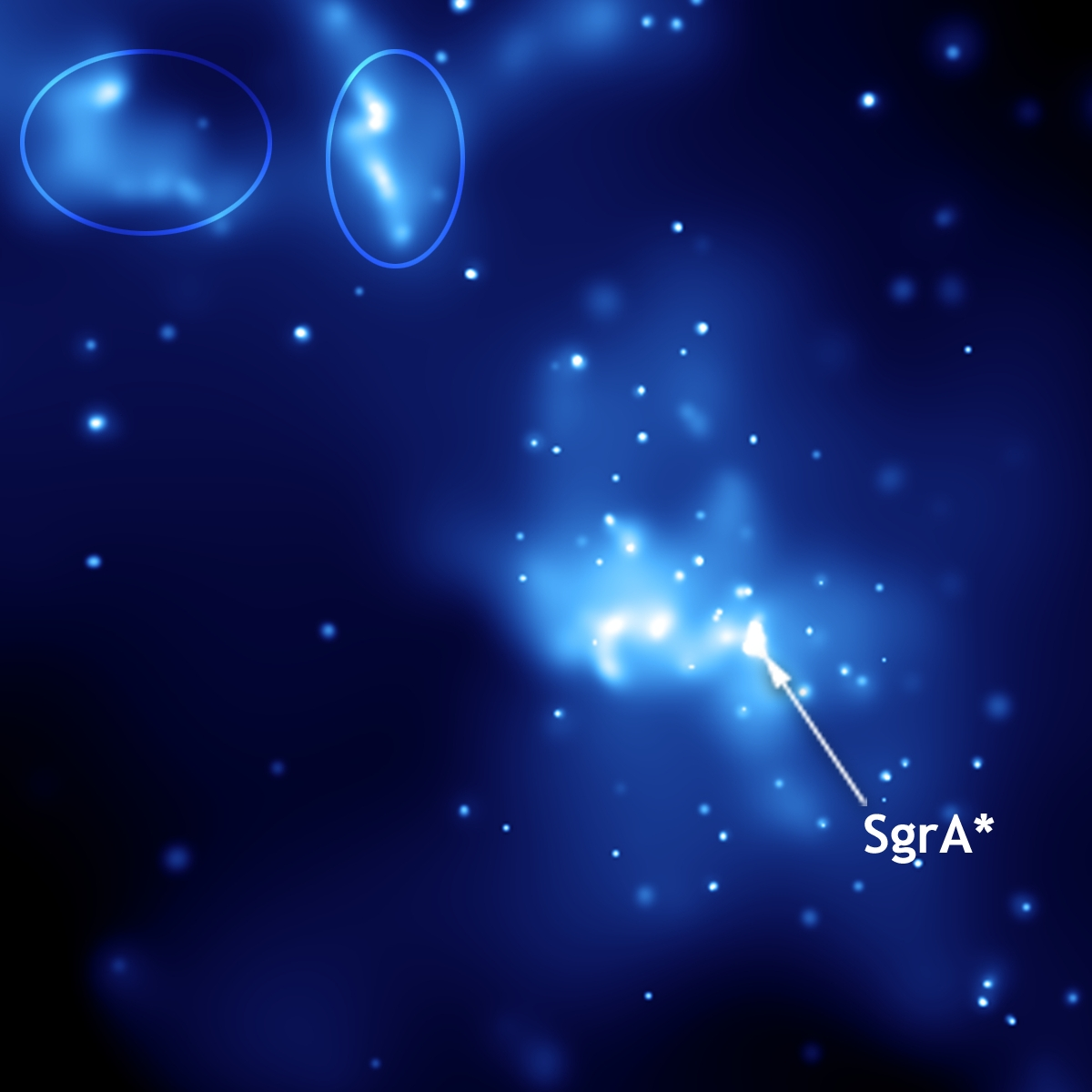
Soft X-ray image of Sagittarius A* (center) and two light echoes from a recent explosion (circled)

The EHT is composed of many radio observatories, or radio-telescope facilities, around the world, working together to produce a high-sensitivity, high-angular-resolution telescope. Through the technique of very-long-baseline interferometry (VLBI), many independent radio antennas separated by hundreds or thousands of kilometres can act as a phased array, a virtual telescope which can be pointed electronically, with an effective aperture which is the diameter of the entire planet, substantially improving its angular resolution. The effort includes development and deployment of submillimeter dual polarization receivers, highly stable frequency standards to enable very-long-baseline interferometry at 230–450 GHz, higher-bandwidth VLBI backends and recorders, as well as commissioning of new submillimeter VLBI sites.

The first image of the Milky Way's supermassive black hole, Sagittarius A*, was expected to be produced from data taken in April 2017, but because there are no flights in or out of the South Pole during austral winter (April to October), the full data set could not be processed until December 2017, when the shipment of data from the South Pole Telescope arrived.

Data collected on hard drives are transported by commercial freight airplanes (a so-called sneakernet) from the various telescopes to the MIT Haystack Observatory and the Max Planck Institute for Radio Astronomy, where the data are cross-correlated and analyzed on a grid computer made from about 800 CPUs all connected through a 40 Gbit/s network.

Because of the COVID-19 pandemic, weather patterns, and celestial mechanics, the 2020 observational campaign was postponed to March 2021.

Participating telescopes
Telescope	Picture	Joined	Status	Responsible institution	Notes
Submillimeter Telescope (SMT)		2017	Active	Arizona Radio Observatory	
Atacama Pathfinder Experiment		2017	Active	Max Planck Institute for Radio Astronomy	
IRAM 30m telescope		2017	Active	Institut de radioastronomie millimétrique	
James Clerk Maxwell Telescope		2017	Active	East Asian Observatory	Mainly headed by the ASIAA and the NAOJ, operating from the Pacific. The team gained access to the telescope after the UK decided to cease operating the observatory.
Large Millimeter Telescope		2017	Active	NIAOE (Mexico) and the University of Massachusetts Amherst (US)	
Submillimeter Array		2017	Active	Harvard-Smithsonian CfA and ASIAA	
Atacama Large Millimeter Array		2017	Active	NRAO (US), NAOJ (Japan), ASIAA (Taiwan), ESO (Europe), and local collaboration at the Republic of Chile	The system is formed through a collaboration of three main partners, ie ALMA-NA (North America), ALMA-EU (Europe), and ALMA-J (Japan), with ASIAA being part of both the ALMA-J and ALMA-NA. It is one of the highest resolution nodes in the system.
South Pole Telescope		2017	Active	UChicago, NSF, and DOE with a handful of American institution partners	
Greenland Telescope		2018	Active	Harvard-Smithsonian CfA and ASIAA	Using the ALMA-North America prototype, which was awarded to the binational group of the Harvard CfA and the ASIAA by the NSF, with the ASIAA having contributed as part of ALMA-North America.
Northern Extended Millimeter Array		2018	Active	Institut de radioastronomie millimétrique	
ARO 12m Radio Telescope		2021	Active	Arizona Radio Observatory	The ALMA-Europe prototype, which was awarded to the University of Arizona after the American one was awarded to the joint-Harvard-Smithsonian-ASIAA group.
OVRO 10m		planned for late 2026	Planned	Owens Valley Radio Observatory	One of the 10-meter dishes from the Combined Array for Research in Millimeter-wave Astronomy, currently being reconfigured and refurbished to join the EHT.
Haystack 37m Telescope			Planned	MIT Haystack	Undergoing retrofits and upgrades for future participation. The system will slowly expand its observation spectrum from some a hundred GHz to finally the required frequency through multiple upgrades.
Africa Millimeter Telescope (AMT)		planned for 2028	Planned	Radboud University, Oxford University, University of Nambia, University of Amsterdam, and the University of South Africa	A new telescope built from the ground up with the EHT participation in mind, aiming to supplement current EHT capability from the African continent with an observation range from 8 to 345GHz. The system will be located at the vicinity of the HESS Observatory, Nambia at an altitude of 1,900m upon commissioning, with further plans to be relocated to the top of the Gamsberg plateau with an altitude of 2,347m later.
ngEHT (Next Generation EHT) telescopes		planned for 2030.	Planned	The Event Horizon Telescope collaboration, mainly headed by the Harvard–Smithsonian CfA	New 13m telescopes built by the Harvard–Smithsonian CfA and Mtex Technology GmbH of Schauenburg International. A total of four preliminary stations are planned.

=== VLBI mechanism ===
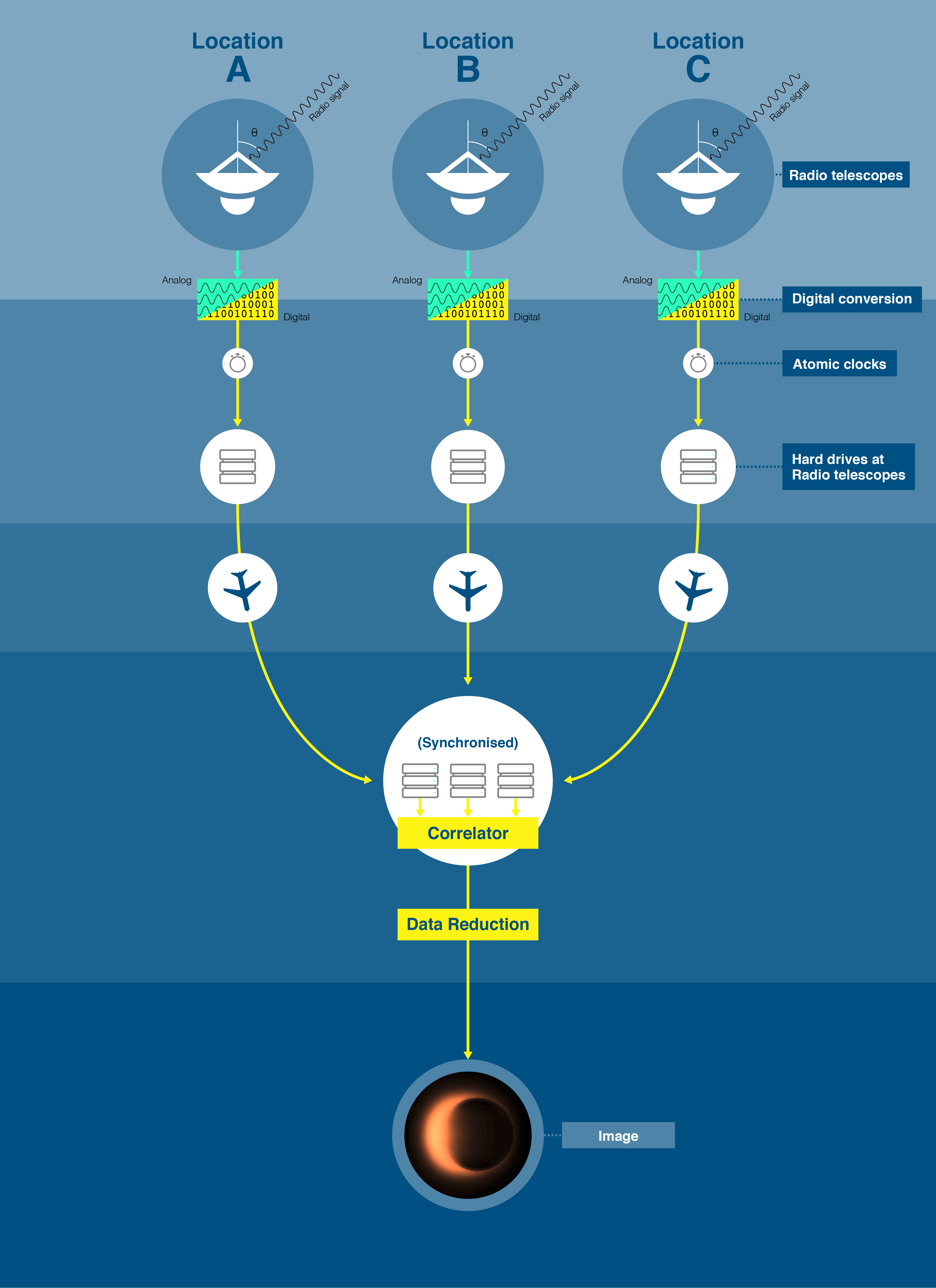
A schematic diagram of the VLBI mechanism of EHT

Each antenna, spread out over vast distances, has an extremely precise atomic clock. Analogue signals collected by the antenna are converted to digital signals and stored on hard drives together with the time signals provided by the atomic clock. The hard drives are then shipped to a central location to be synchronized. An astronomical observation image is obtained by processing the data gathered from multiple locations.

== Published images ==
=== Messier 87* ===
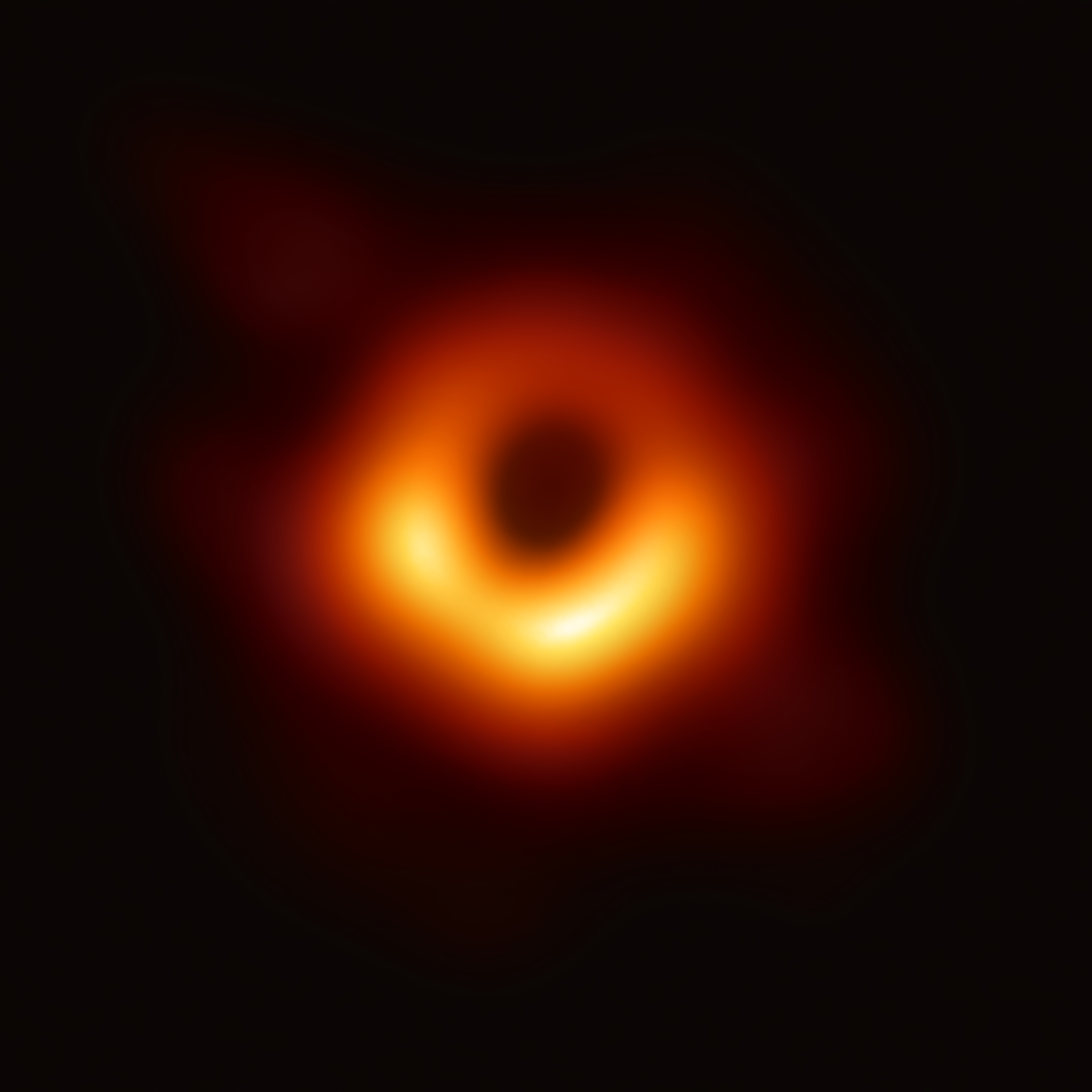
Image of M87* generated from data gathered by the Event Horizon Telescope

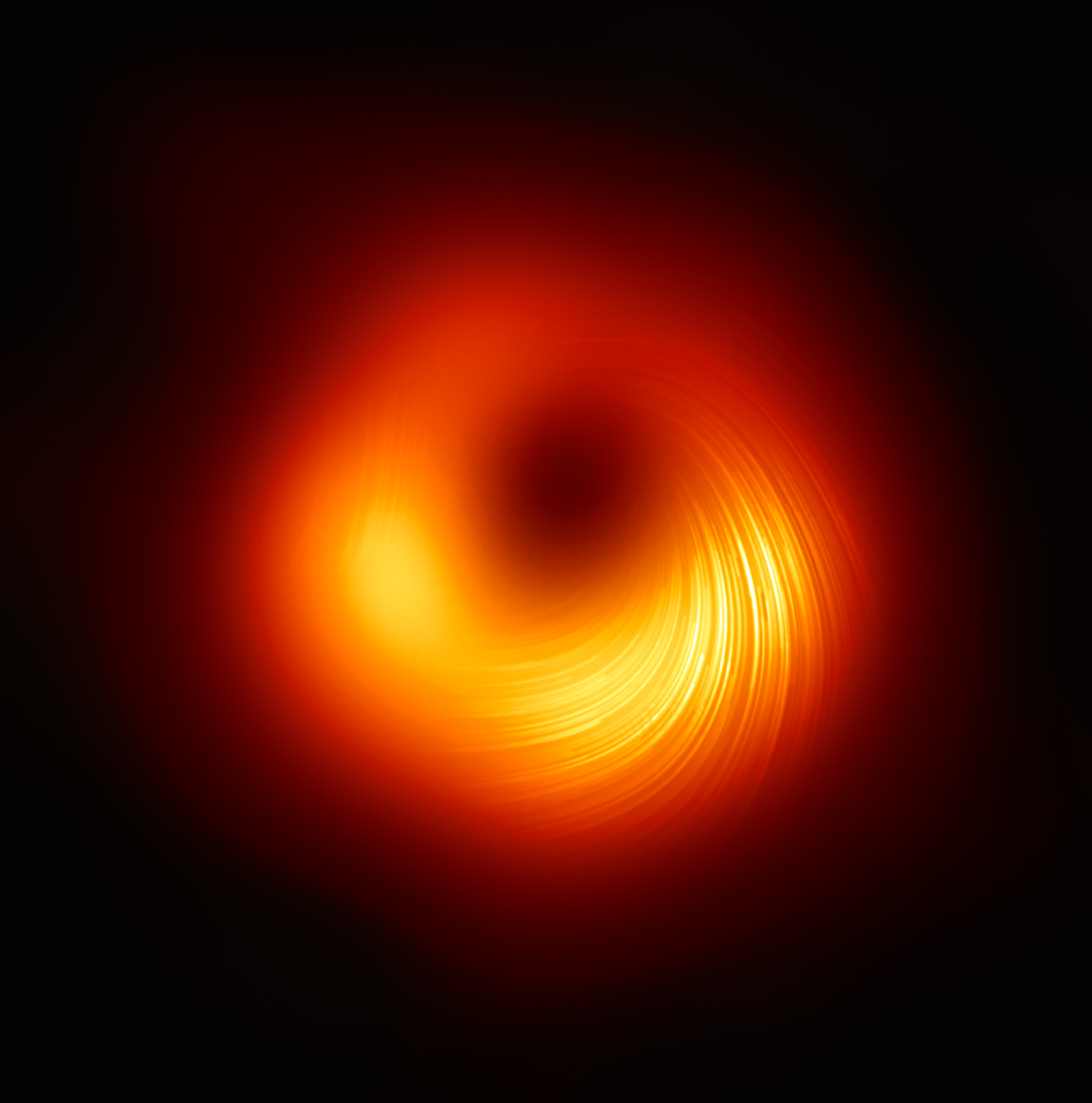
A view of M87* black hole in polarised light

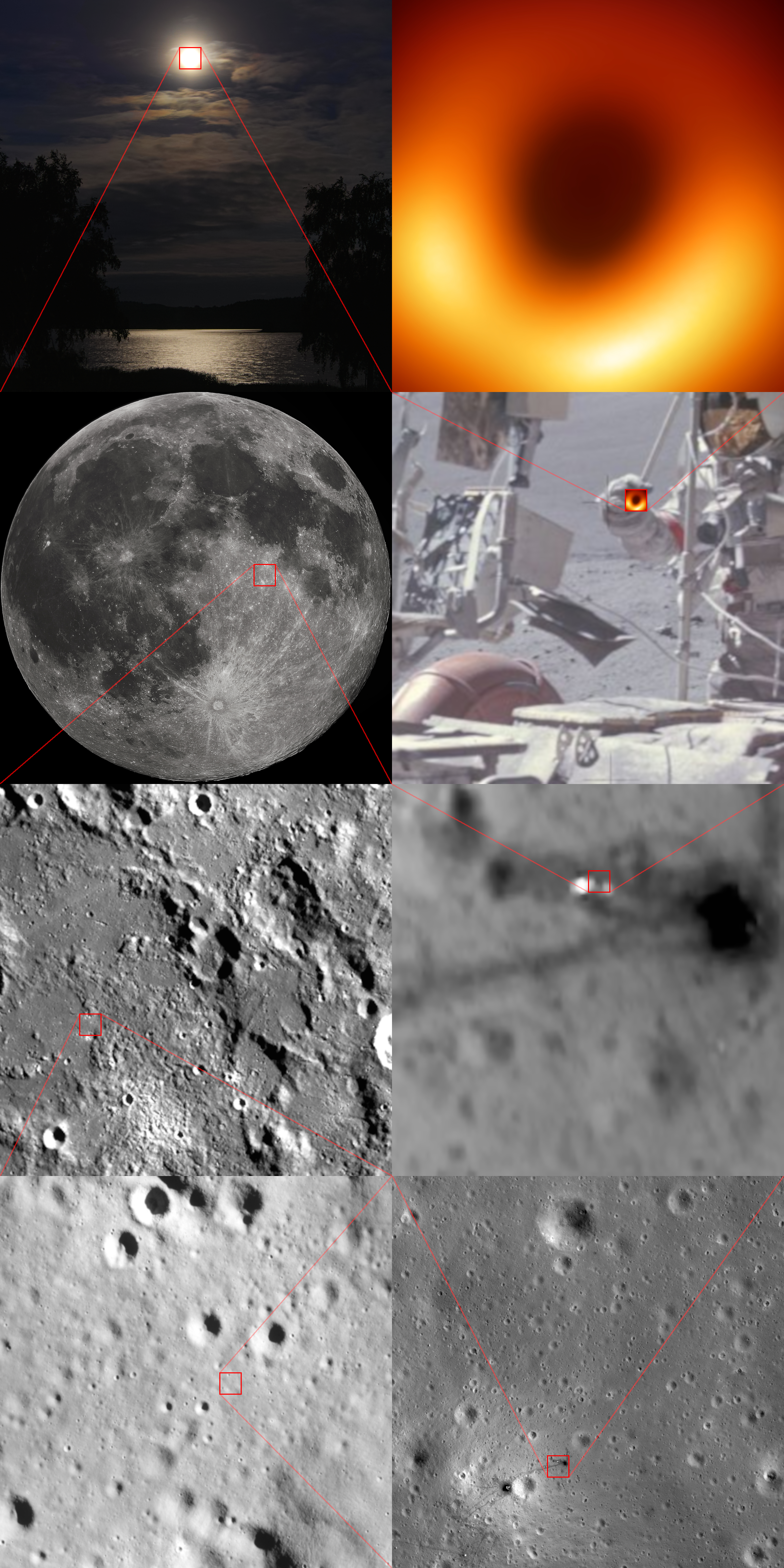
A series of images descriptive of the level of magnification achieved by the EHT (akin to seeing, from the Earth's surface, an object the size of a tennis ball on the Moon); starts at top-left image and moves counter−clockwise to finish at top-right corner

The Event Horizon Telescope Collaboration announced its first results in six simultaneous press conferences worldwide on April 10, 2019. The announcement featured the first direct image of a black hole, which showed the supermassive black hole at the center of Messier 87, designated M87*. The scientific results were presented in a series of six papers published in The Astrophysical Journal Letters. A clockwise rotating black hole was observed in the 6σ region.

The image provided a test for Albert Einstein's general theory of relativity under extreme conditions. Studies have previously tested general relativity by looking at the motions of stars and gas clouds near the edge of a black hole. However, an image of a black hole brings observations even closer to the event horizon. Relativity predicts a dark shadow-like region, caused by gravitational bending and capture of light, which matches the observed image. The published paper states: "Overall, the observed image is consistent with expectations for the shadow of a spinning Kerr black hole as predicted by general relativity." Paul T. P. Ho, EHT Board member, said: "Once we were sure we had imaged the shadow, we could compare our observations to extensive computer models that include the physics of warped space, superheated matter, and strong magnetic fields. Many of the features of the observed image match our theoretical understanding surprisingly well."

The image also provided new measurements for the mass and diameter of M87*. EHT measured the black hole's mass to be 6.5±0.7 billion solar masses and measured the diameter of its event horizon to be approximately 40 billion kilometres (270 AU; 0.0013 pc; 0.0042 ly), roughly 2.5 times smaller than the shadow that it casts, seen at the center of the image. Previous observations of M87 showed that the large-scale jet is inclined at an angle of 17° relative to the observer's line of sight and oriented on the plane of the sky at a position angle of −72°. From the enhanced brightness of the southern part of the ring due to relativistic beaming of approaching funnel wall jet emission, EHT concluded the black hole, which anchors the jet, spins clockwise, as seen from Earth. EHT simulations allow for both prograde and retrograde inner disk rotation with respect to the black hole, while excluding zero black hole spin using a conservative minimum jet power of 10^{42} erg/s via the Blandford–Znajek process.

Producing an image from data from an array of radio telescopes requires much mathematical work. Four independent teams created images to assess the reliability of the results. These methods included both an established algorithm in radio astronomy for image reconstruction known as CLEAN, invented by Jan Högbom, as well as self-calibrating image processing methods for astronomy such as the CHIRP algorithm created by Katherine Bouman and others. The algorithms that were ultimately used were a regularized maximum likelihood (RML) algorithm and the CLEAN algorithm.

In March 2020, astronomers proposed an improved way of seeing more of the rings in the first black hole image. In March 2021, a new photo was revealed, showing how the M87 black hole looks in polarised light. This is the first time astronomers have been able to measure polarisation so close to the edge of a black hole. The lines on the photo mark the orientation of polarisation, which is related to the magnetic field around the shadow of the black hole.

In August 2022, a team led by University of Waterloo researcher Avery Broderick released a "remaster[ed]" version of original image generated from the data collected by the EHT. This image "resolve[d] a fundamental signature of gravity around a black hole", with it showing a displaying photon ring around M87*. The claim has been subsequently disputed.

In 2023, EHT released new, sharper images of the M87 black hole, reconstructed from the same 2017 data but created using the PRIMO algorithm.

=== 3C 279 ===
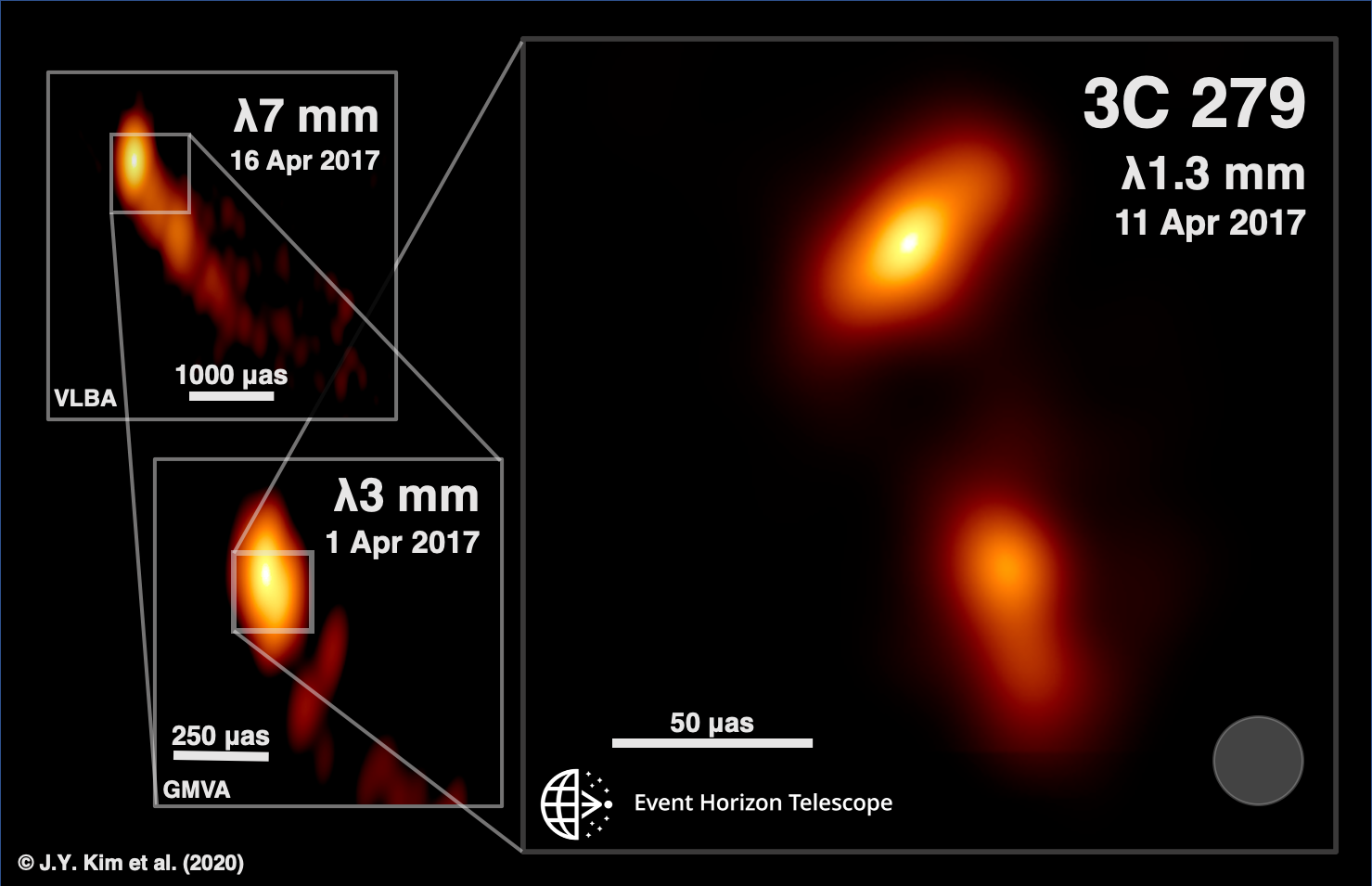
EHT image of the archetypal blazar 3C 279 showing a relativistic jet down to the AGN core surrounding the supermassive black hole

In April 2020, the EHT released the first 20 microarcsecond resolution images of the archetypal blazar 3C 279 it observed in April 2017. These images, generated from observations over 4 nights in April 2017, reveal bright components of a jet whose projection on the observer plane exhibit apparent superluminal motions with speeds up to 20 c. Such apparent superluminal motion from relativistic emitters such as an approaching jet is explained by emission originating closer to the observer (downstream along the jet) catching up with emission originating further from the observer (at the jet base) as the jet propagates close to the speed of light at small angles to the line of sight.

=== Centaurus A ===
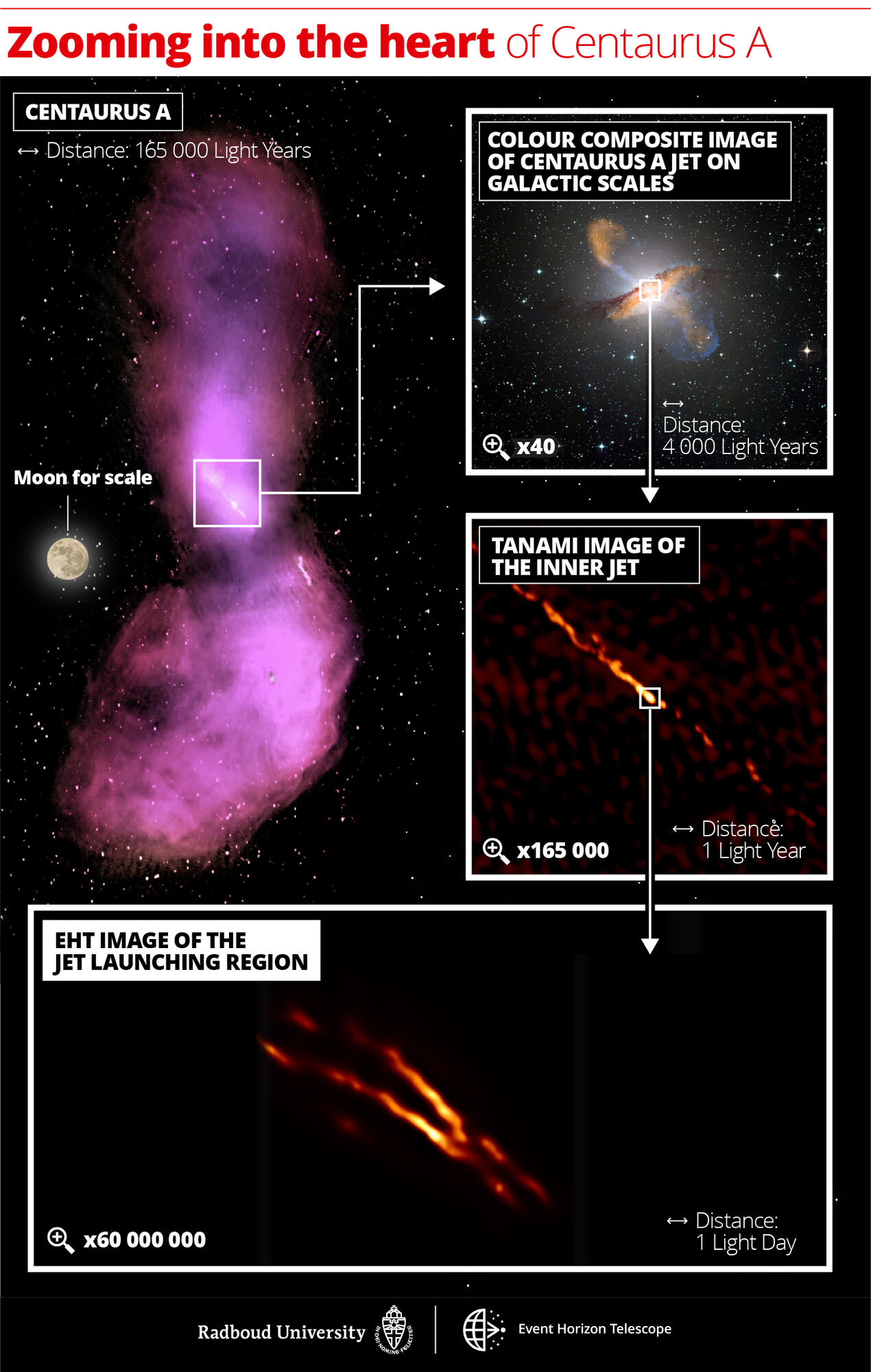
Image of Centaurus A showing its black hole jet at different scales

In July 2021, high resolution images of the jet produced by a supermassive black hole sitting at the center of Centaurus A were released. With a mass around 5.5×10^{7} M_{☉}, the black hole is not large enough for its photon sphere to be observed, as in EHT images of Messier M87*, but its jet extends even beyond its host galaxy while staying as a highly collimated beam which is a point of study. Edge-brightening of the jet was also observed which would exclude models of particle acceleration that are unable to reproduce this effect. The image was 16 times sharper than previous observations and utilized a 1.3 mm wavelength.

=== Sagittarius A* ===
Sagittarius A*, first image released in 2022

Sagittarius A* in polarised light, image released in 2024

On May 12, 2022, the EHT Collaboration revealed an image of Sagittarius A*, the supermassive black hole at the center of the Milky Way galaxy. The black hole is 27,000 light-years away from Earth; it is thousands of times smaller than M87*. Sera Markoff, Co-Chair of the EHT Science Council, said: "We have two completely different types of galaxies and two very different black hole masses, but close to the edge of these black holes they look amazingly similar. This tells us that General Relativity governs these objects up close, and any differences we see further away must be due to differences in the material that surrounds the black holes."

On March 22, 2024, the EHT Collaboration released an image of Sagittarius A* in polarized light.

=== J1924-2914 ===
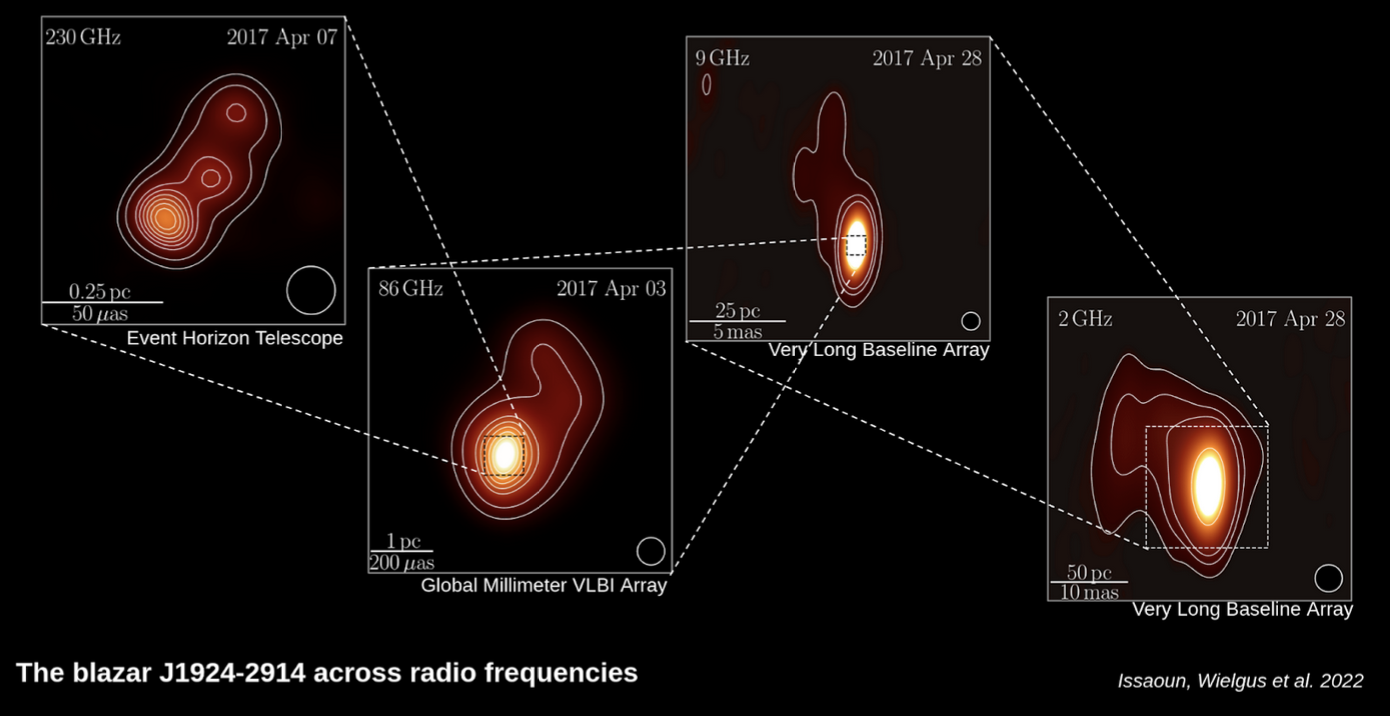
A multifrequency view of the bent jet in Blazar J1924-2914

In August 2022, the EHT together with Global Millimeter VLBI Array and the Very Long Baseline Array imaged the distant blazar J1924-2914. They operated at 230 GHz, 86 GHz and 2.3+8.7 GHz, respectively, the highest angular resolution images of polarized emission from a quasar ever obtained. Observations reveal a helically bent jet and the polarization of its emission suggest a toroidal magnetic field structure. The object is used as calibrator for Sagittarius A* sharing strong optical variability and polarization with it.

=== NRAO 530 ===
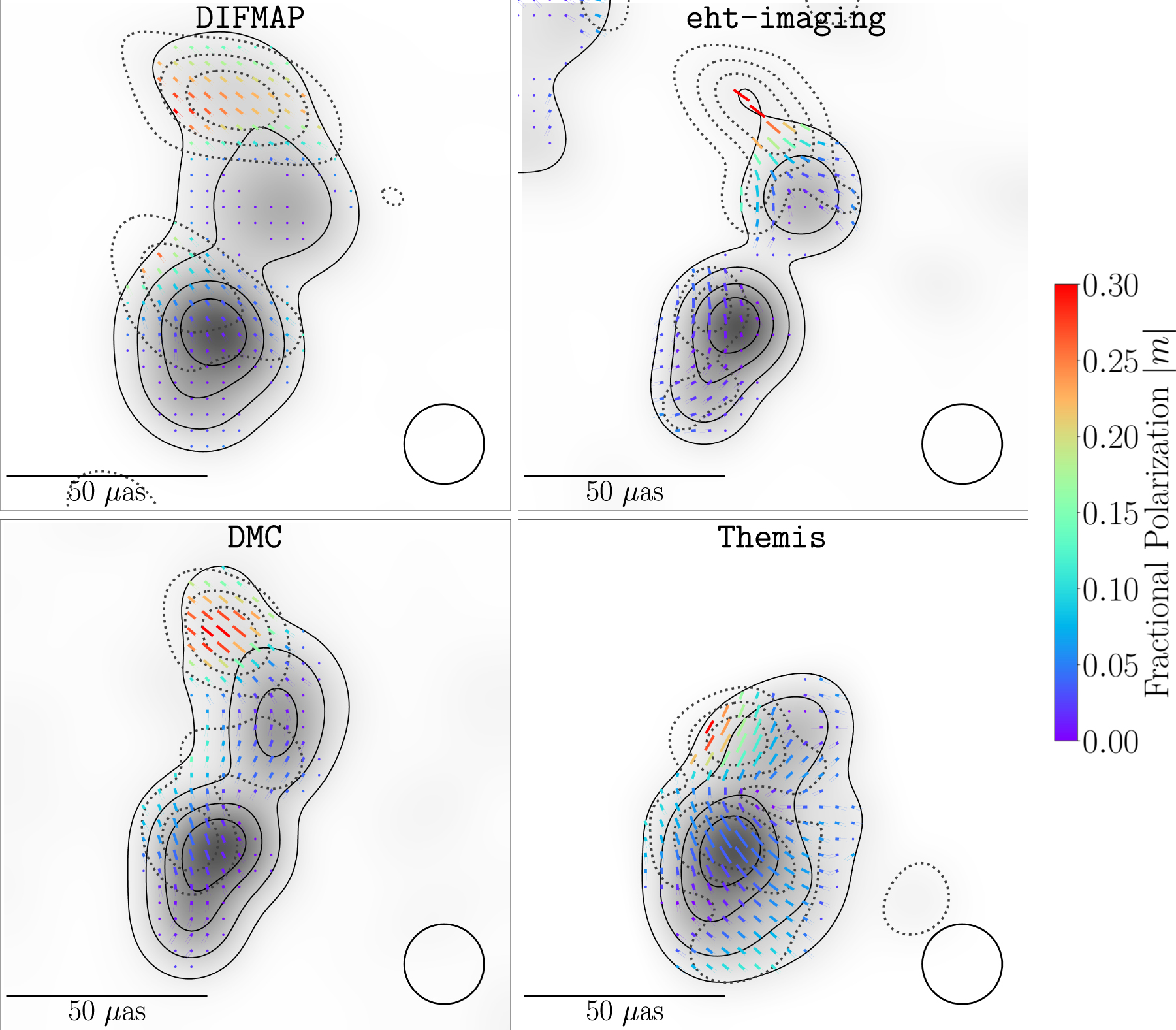
NRAO 530 by EHT. The total intensity is shown in grayscale with black contours indicating 10%, 25%, 50%, and 75% of the peak LP intensity. Black dotted contours indicate 25%, 50%, and 75% of the peak polarized intensity.

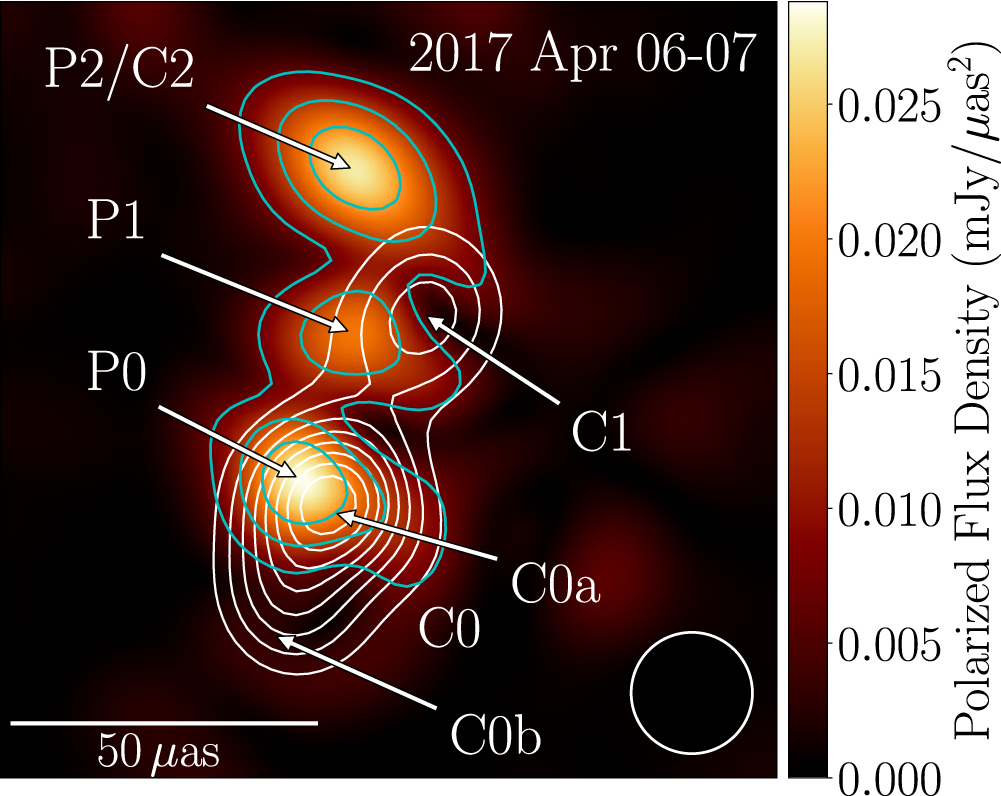
Schematic of the total-intensity and LP components in the EHT fiducial image of NRAO 530; white contours show the total intensity levels; color scale and cyan contours represent the polarized intensity of the method-averaged image.

In February 2023, the EHT reported on the observations of the quasar NRAO 530. NRAO 530 (1730−130, J1733−1304) is a flat-spectrum radio quasar (FSRQ) that belongs to the class of bright γ-ray blazars and shows significant variability across the entire electromagnetic spectrum. The source was monitored by the University of Michigan Radio Observatory at 4.8, 8.4, and 14.5 GHz for several decades until 2012. The quasar underwent a dramatic radio outburst in 1997, during which its flux density at 14.5 GHz exceeded 10 Jy, while the average value is ~2 Jy. Since 2002, NRAO 530 has been monitored by the Submillimeter Array (SMA; Maunakea, Hawaii) at 1.3 mm and 870 μm. NRAO 530 has a redshift of z = 0.902 (Junkkarinen 1984), for which 100 μas corresponds to a linear distance of 6 billion pc. The source contains a supermassive black hole, the mass of which is currently uncertain, with estimates ranging from 3×10^{8} M_{☉} to 2×10^{9} M_{☉}.

It was observed with the Event Horizon Telescope on April 5−7, 2017, when NRAO 530 was used as a calibrator for the EHT observations of Sagittarius A*. The observations were performed with the full EHT 2017 array of eight telescopes located at six geographical sites. At z = 0.902, this is the most distant object imaged by the EHT so far. The team reconstructed the first images of the source at 230 GHz, at an angular resolution of about 20 μas, both in total intensity and in linear polarization (LP). Source variability was not detected, that allowed to represent the whole data set with static images. The images reveal a bright feature located on the southern end of the jet, which was associated with the core. The feature is linearly polarized, with a fractional polarization of about 5%–8%, and it has a substructure consisting of two components. Their observed brightness temperature suggests that the energy density of the jet is dominated by the magnetic field. The jet extends over 60 μas along a position angle about −28°. It includes two features with orthogonal directions of polarization (electric vector position angle), parallel and perpendicular to the jet axis, consistent with a helical structure of the magnetic field in the jet. The outermost feature has a particularly high degree of LP, suggestive of a nearly uniform magnetic field.

== Collaborating institutes ==
The EHT Collaboration consists of 13 stakeholder institutes:

- the Academia Sinica Institute of Astronomy and Astrophysics
- the University of Arizona
- the University of Chicago
- the East Asian Observatory
- Goethe University Frankfurt
- Smithsonian Astrophysical Observatory (part of the Harvard–Smithsonian Center for Astrophysics)
- Institut de radioastronomie millimétrique (IRAM, itself a collaboration between the French CNRS, the German Max Planck Society, and the Spanish Instituto Geográfico Nacional)
- Large Millimeter Telescope Alfonso Serrano
- Max Planck Institute for Radio Astronomy
- MIT Haystack Observatory
- National Astronomical Observatory of Japan
- Perimeter Institute for Theoretical Physics
- Radboud University

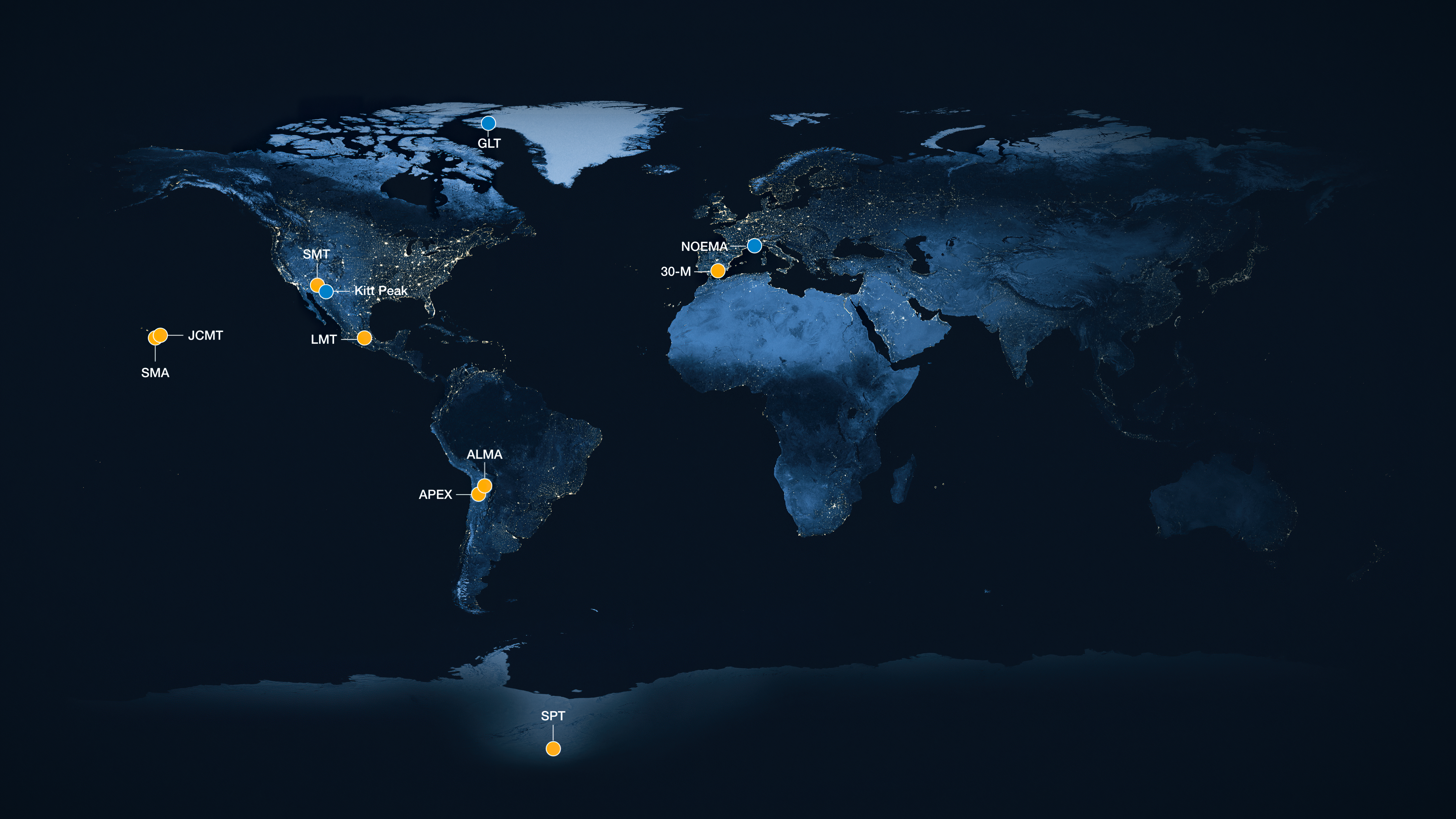
Locations of the telescopes that make up the EHT array. A global map showing the radio observatories that form the Event Horizon Telescope (EHT) network used to image the Milky Way's central black hole, Sagittarius A*. The telescopes highlighted in yellow were part of the EHT network during the observations of Sagittarius A* in 2017. These include the Atacama Large Millimeter/submillimeter Array (ALMA), the Atacama Pathfinder EXperiment (APEX), IRAM 30-meter telescope (30-M), James Clark Maxwell Telescope (JCMT), Large Millimeter Telescope (LMT), Submillimeter Array (SMA), Submillimetere Telescope (SMT) and South Pole Telescope (SPT). Highlighted in blue are the three telescopes added to the EHT Collaboration after 2018: the Greenland Telescope (GLT), the NOrthern Extended Millimeter Array (NOEMA) in France, and the University of Arizona ARO 12-meter Telescope at Kitt Peak.

== Funding ==
The EHT Collaboration receives funding from numerous sources including:

- United States National Science Foundation
- European Research Council
- National Science and Technology Council of Taiwan (formerly Ministry of Science and Technology of Taiwan)
- Max Planck Society
- Consejo Nacional de Ciencia y Technologia, Mexico
- John Templeton Foundation
- Gordon and Betty Moore Foundation
- Japan Society for the Promotion of Science
- Natural Sciences and Engineering Research Council of Canada
- Academia Sinica
- Smithsonian Institution

Additionally, Western Digital and Xilinx are industry donors.
