= Lulin Observatory =

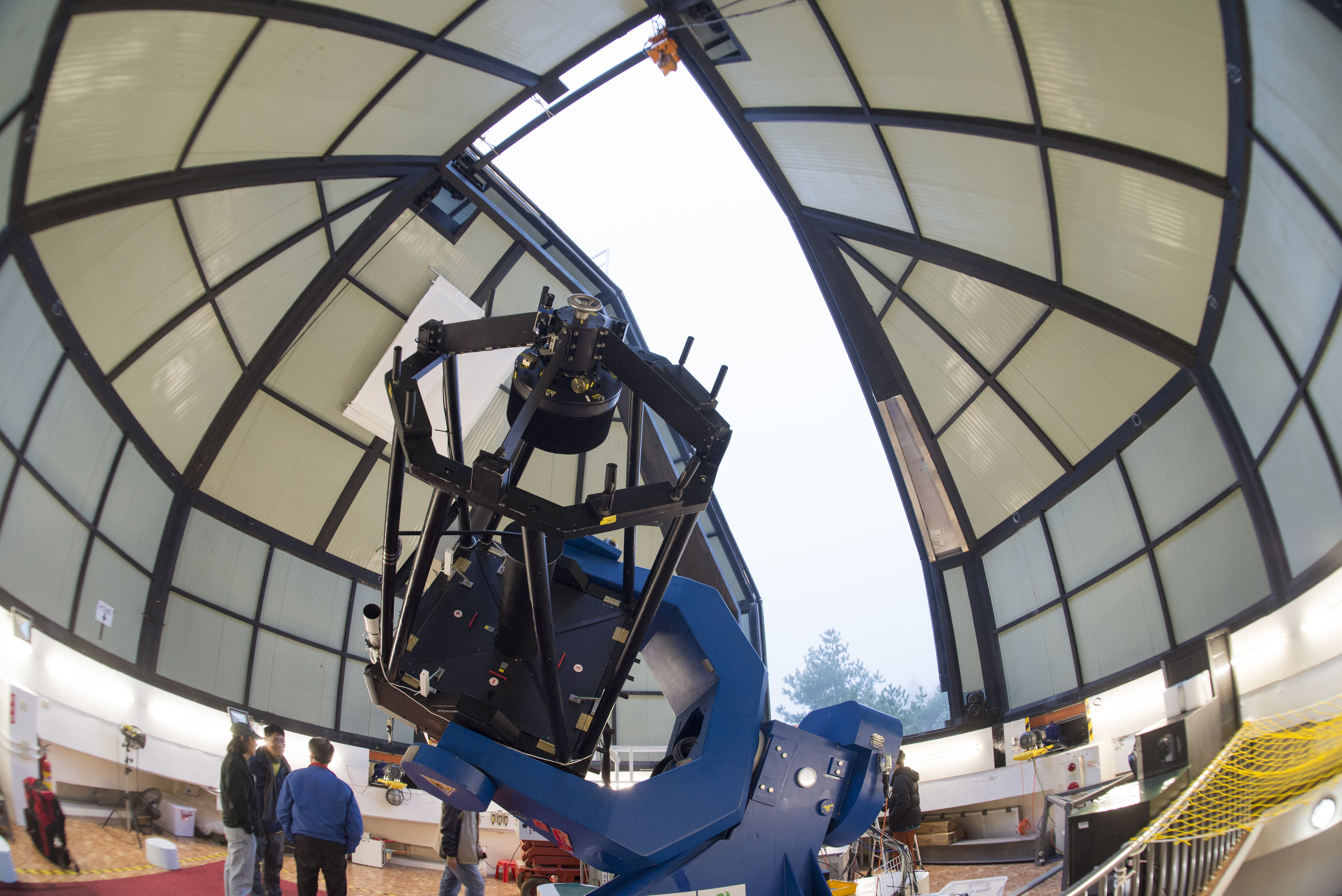
- Organization: National Central University
- Observatory code: D35
- Location: Nantou County, Taiwan, TW
- Coordinates: 23°28′09″N 120°52′22″E
- Altitude: 2,862 m (9,390 ft)
- Established: 13 January 1999
- Website: www.lulin.ncu.edu.tw
- Telescopes: Cassegrain reflector; Ritchey–Chrétien telescope
- Related media on Commons

The Lulin Observatory (Chinese: 鹿林天文台; pinyin: Lùlín Tiānwéntái, obs. code: D35) is an astronomical observatory operated by the Institute of Astronomy, National Central University in Taiwan.

It is located at the summit of Lulin Front Mountain in Xinyi Township, Nantou County. In 2007, Comet Lulin (C/2007 N3), was found by this observatory, and became the first comet discovered by a Taiwanese researcher. The minor planet 147918 Chiayi was also discovered here.

The Lulin 1 meter telescope had its first light in September 2002, after 10 years of development.

In 2024, the Observatory completed its wildfire prevention efforts via its firebreak. The construction work was initiated back in 2001, though the work only started in 2019 owing to delays. It spans a width of approximately 30 meters.

== Telescopes ==
=== Operational (7) ===
- LOT (Lulin One-meter Telescope) Cassegrain telescope (D=1-m, f/8)
- SLT (Seisi Lulin Telescope) R-C telescope (D=0.40-m, f/8.4) by RC Optical Systems
- LWT (Lulin Widefield Telescope) Harmer-Wayne telescope (D=0.40-m, f/3.8) by Officina Stellare with RiFAst Astrograph system

==== Co-hosted (in place of the four TAOS telescopes) ====
- RoLIFE (Robotic observatory for Lunar Impact Flash Exploration) telescope (D=0.30-m) with Taipei Astronomical Museum
- LATTE (Lulin-ASIAA Telescope for Transients and Education) telescope (D=0.50-m, f/6.8) with ASIAA
- Two RIFT (Robotic Imager For Transients) telescopes (D=0.50-m) with National Cheng Kung University

=== Retired (6) ===
- SLT76 (Super Light Telescope) Cassegrain telescope (D=0.76-m, f/9) by NCU and its collaborators
- Four TAOS robotic telescopes (D=0.50-m, f/1.9)
- L35 Schmidt–Cassegrain telescope (D=0.35-m, f/8.25)

== Projects ==
- Taiwanese–American Occultation Survey (TAOS)
- Lulin Emission Line Imaging Survey (LELIS)
- Exoearth Discovery & Exploration Network EDEN

=== Lulin Sky Survey (LUSS) ===
The Lulin Sky Survey searched for near-Earth objects from 2006 to 2009. The Lulin Sky Survey Telescope, a 16-inch (41 cm) Ritchey–Chrétien telescope with a field of view of 27 arcminutes, was operated remotely from mainland China, with robotic software developed in-house. In addition to searching for new objects, the survey refined the orbits of known minor planets and comets, and performed photometric analysis of a subset of objects. The principal investigator, student Quan-Zhi Ye of Sun Yat-sen University, was awarded the 2007 Shoemaker NEO Grant to develop the project. Ye later identified a comet from images collected in July 2007 by collaborator Chi Sheng Lin; the unusual retrograde comet, formally named C/2007 N3, became known as Comet Lulin. It made its closest approach to Earth in February 2009. Over the course of the survey, 781 new objects were discovered, including Comet Lulin and three fragments of comet 73P/Schwassmann-Wachmann. The LUSS project benefited from its location at a longitude with few other observatories looking for minor planets.

== See also ==
- List of astronomical observatories
