= Katie Bowman =

Katie Bowman may refer to:

- Katie Bowman, character in Colony (TV series)
- Katie Bowman, character in Roommates (TV series)

== See also ==
- Katie Bouman (born 1989), American computer scientist
