= Taiwanese–American Occultation Survey =

Astrophysics survey project

Taiwanese–American Occultation Survey II
- Website: Official website

The Taiwanese–American Occultation Survey (TAOS) is a robotic survey of the Outer Solar System. TAOS uses an array of four 50 cm aperture telescopes to monitor background stars awaiting the alignment of an Outer Solar System with a star target: an occultation. Small objects in the Outer Solar System that are too small to be observed by direct observations at this time can be probed with this technique. Occultation surveys take advantage of diffraction effects during the transit of the occulting object (the occulter) in front of a background star to constraint the size and distance of the occulter. TAOS is sensitive to occultations by Kuiper Belt Objects (KBOs) larger than about 500 m in diameter and to Sedna-like objects.

The TAOS telescopes are located in Taiwan, at the Lulin Observatory in Yushan National Park.

TAOS is a joint effort of the Academia Sinica Institute of Astronomy and Astrophysics, Center for Astrophysics | Harvard & Smithsonian, Lawrence Livermore National Laboratory, The Institute of Geophysics and Planetary Physics, National Central University, Institute of Astronomy and Yonsei University, South Korea.

Currently, an expansion to the TAOS project is being planned called TAOS II, with a new meaning to the acronym, the Transneptunian Automated Occultation Survey. The data volume is expected to be over 300 terabytes per year.
