= Summit Station (Greenland) =

Research station near the apex of the Greenland Ice Sheet

Coordinates: 72°34′46.50″N 38°27′33.07″W

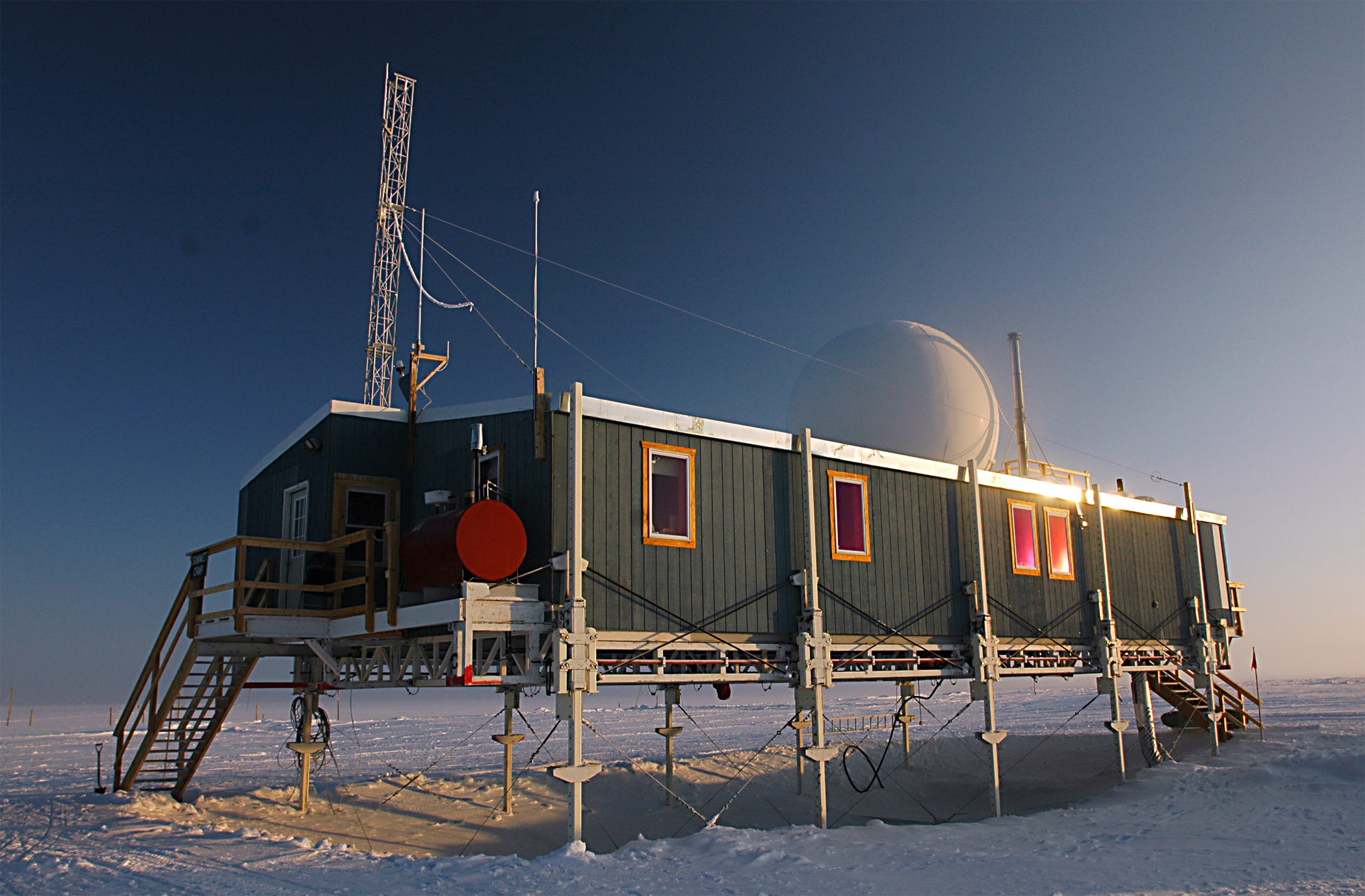
Summit Station

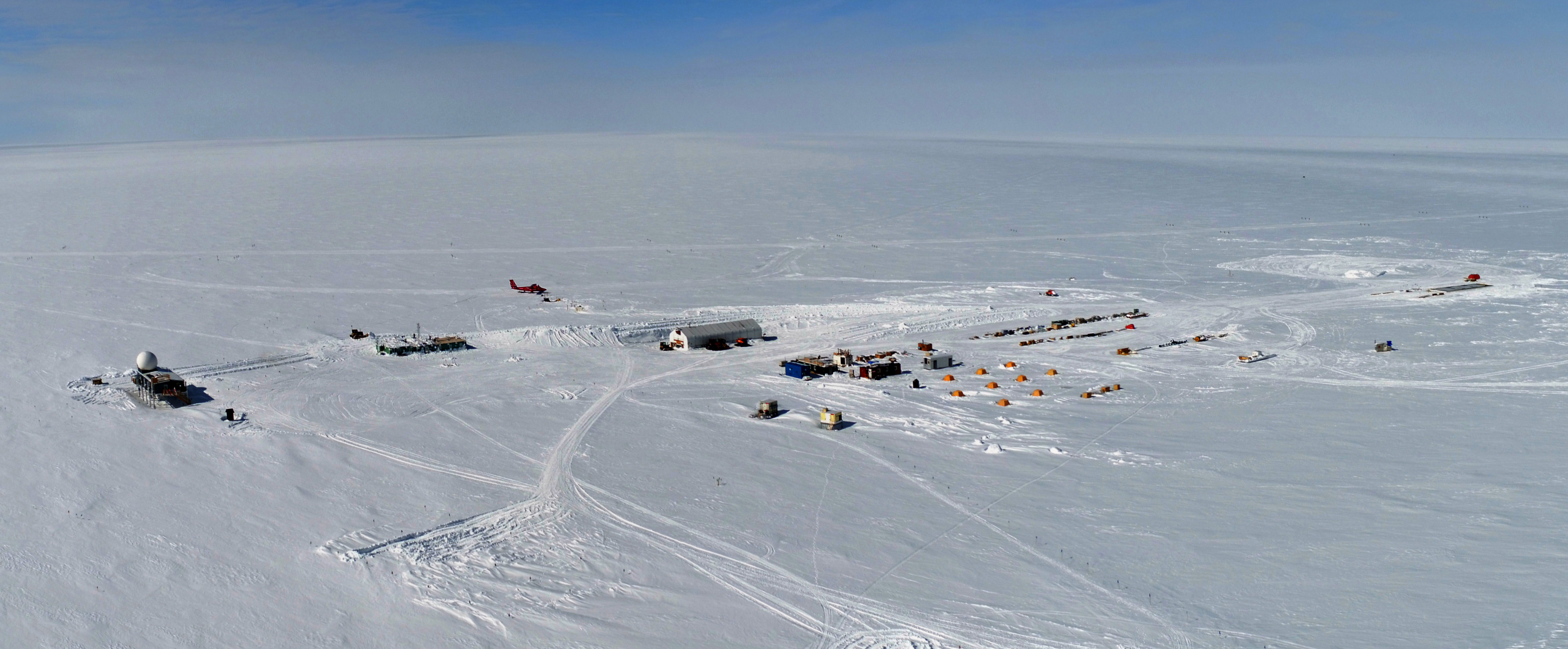
Overview of the area around Summit Station

Location of Summit Station within Northeast Greenland National Park

Aerial video of Summit Camp

Summit Station, formerly Summit Camp, is a year-round staffed research station near the apex of the Greenland ice sheet. The station is located at 3,216 metres (10,551 ft) above sea level.

The population of the station is typically five in wintertime and up to 52 in the summer, with berthing for 53 as of August 2026. The station is operated by the United States National Science Foundation through the logistical-support contractor Battelle Arctic Research Operations (Battelle ARO). A permit from the Danish Polar Center (Danish: Dansk Polarcenter) under the auspices of the Government of Greenland (Greenlandic: Kalaallit Nunaanni Inatsisartut) is required to visit the station.

== Geography ==
The station is located approximately 360 km (220 mi) from the east coast of Greenland, 500 km (310 mi) from the west coast (at Saattut, Uummannaq), and 200 km (120 mi) north-northeast of the historical ice sheet station Eismitte. The closest town is Ittoqqortoormiit, 460 km (290 mi) east-southeast of the station. The station, however, is not part of the Sermersooq municipality but falls within the bounds of the Northeast Greenland National Park.

Summit Station consists of the Station Operations Facility (communications and galley), Mobile Science Facility, Atmospheric Watch Observatory, Berthing Module, Summit Mobile Garage, and supporting structures.

The surface elevation at Summit Station has increased at an average of 1.9 cm (0.75 in) per year over the period 2008–2018. Accumulation is the single largest factor in elevation change.

== History ==
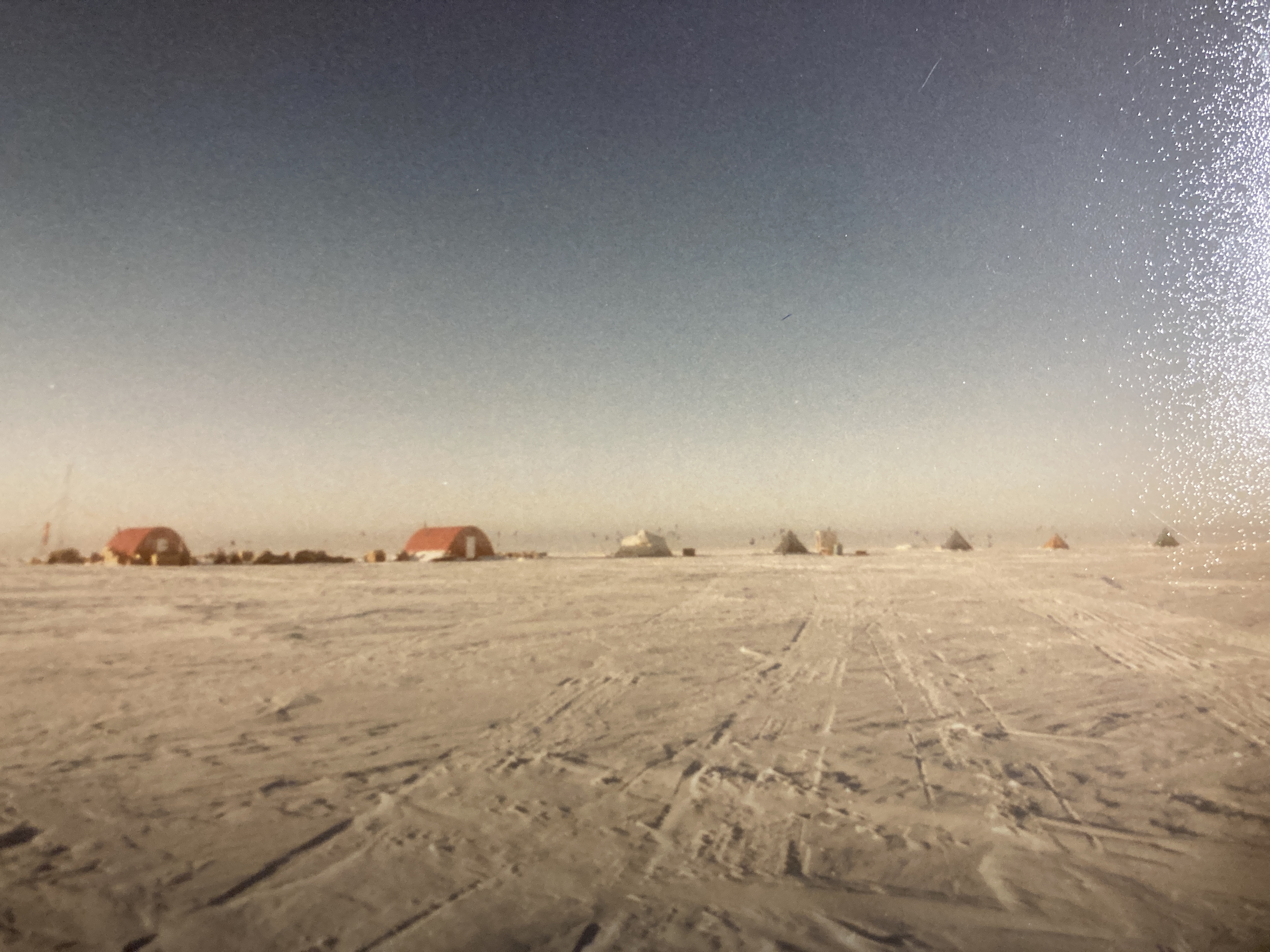
Summit week 1, 1989

Summit Station was originally established in April 1989 in support of the Greenland Ice Sheet Project Two (GISP2) deep ice coring effort. A ski-equipped C-130 from the New York Air National Guard performed an open snow landing near the site, bringing the put-in team consisting of Mark Twickler, Jay Klink, Michael Morrison, and two navigation specialists; Doug Roberts and Jim Normandeau who located the exact location chosen for the GISP2 drilling site, established a camp, and laid out the runway. Subsequent flights brought in additional materials and personnel needed to build the station.

Two major structures were planned and built: The Big House, an insulated panel building (housing a galley, common space, and office), elevated to minimize snow drifts; and a geodesic drill dome to house the deep drill. Extensive under-snow trenches were also constructed to house the core handling, processing, and storage facilities. Many smaller Weatherport hut buildings and tents were also erected as storage and shop areas, as well as sleeping quarters. These were erected and taken down each season. On July 1, 1993, the bedrock was reached. Originally only occupied in the summer, the station has been staffed year-round since 2003, with a winter population of four to five.

The Greenland Telescope is yet to be relocated here, though preparations are still underway.

== Climate ==
The climate is classified as ice cap, with no month having a mean temperature exceeding 0 °C (32 °F). Typical daily maximum temperatures at Summit Camp are around −35 °C (−31 °F) in winter (January) and −10 °C (14 °F) in summer (July). Winter minimum temperatures are typically about −45 °C (−49 °F) and only rarely exceed −20 °C (−4 °F). The highest temperature at Summit Station was 2.2 °C (36.0 °F), recorded on 13 July 2012 and on 28 July 2017; the lowest recorded temperature was −69.6 °C (−93.3 °F) on 22 December 1991. On 6 July 2017 the site recorded the lowest temperature in the northern hemisphere for the month of July at −33.0 °C (−27.4 °F). On August 14, 2021, it rained throughout the entire day at Summit Camp, marking the first time since record-keeping began in 1989 that precipitation had fallen in liquid form at Greenland's glacial summit.

Climate data for Summit Camp, Greenland (1991–2020): altitude 3,209 metres or 10,528 feet
Month	Jan	Feb	Mar	Apr	May	Jun	Jul	Aug	Sep	Oct	Nov	Dec	Year
Record high °C (°F)	−11.7 (10.9)	−11.0 (12.2)	−12.8 (9.0)	−6.5 (20.3)	−1.4 (29.5)	1.8 (35.2)	2.2 (36.0)	0.9 (33.6)	−2.6 (27.3)	−5.5 (22.1)	−7.1 (19.2)	−13.1 (8.4)	2.2 (36.0)
Mean daily maximum °C (°F)	−34.3 (−29.7)	−34.2 (−29.6)	−32.5 (−26.5)	−23.9 (−11.0)	−17.3 (0.9)	−9.9 (14.2)	−8.0 (17.6)	−11.2 (11.8)	−17.4 (0.7)	−26.8 (−16.2)	−31.7 (−25.1)	−34.3 (−29.7)	−23.5 (−10.2)
Daily mean °C (°F)	−40.0 (−40.0)	−39.1 (−38.4)	−38.4 (−37.1)	−31.2 (−24.2)	−19.6 (−3.3)	−14.0 (6.8)	−11.7 (10.9)	−15.6 (3.9)	−22.4 (−8.3)	−31.6 (−24.9)	−36.7 (−34.1)	−39.0 (−38.2)	−28.3 (−18.9)
Mean daily minimum °C (°F)	−45.6 (−50.1)	−44.8 (−48.6)	−44.4 (−47.9)	−38.3 (−36.9)	−28.3 (−18.9)	−18.4 (−1.1)	−17.0 (1.4)	−21.5 (−6.7)	−28.6 (−19.5)	−36.8 (−34.2)	−41.9 (−43.4)	−44.1 (−47.4)	−34.1 (−29.4)
Record low °C (°F)	−64.9 (−84.8)	−65.3 (−85.5)	−67.2 (−89.0)	−57.3 (−71.1)	−47.4 (−53.3)	−35.7 (−32.3)	−33.3 (−27.9)	−40.4 (−40.7)	−47.3 (−53.1)	−55.4 (−67.7)	−60.0 (−76.0)	−63.0 (−81.4)	−67.2 (−89.0)
Source: Danish Meteorological Institute

Climate data for Automatic Weather Station (AWS), Summit Camp, Greenland Ice Sheet
Month	Jan	Feb	Mar	Apr	May	Jun	Jul	Aug	Sep	Oct	Nov	Dec	Year
Record high °C (°F)	−11.7 (10.9)	−11.0 (12.2)	−12.8 (9.0)	−1.2 (29.8)	−1.4 (29.5)	1.8 (35.2)	2.2 (36.0)	0.9 (33.6)	0.1 (32.2)	−5.5 (22.1)	−7.1 (19.2)	−13.1 (8.4)	2.2 (36.0)
Mean daily maximum °C (°F)	−36 (−33)	−38 (−36)	−32 (−26)	−29 (−20)	−19 (−2)	−11 (12)	−11 (12)	−14 (7)	−22 (−8)	−28 (−18)	−28 (−18)	−36 (−33)	−25 (−14)
Daily mean °C (°F)	−43 (−45)	−42 (−44)	−41 (−42)	−33 (−27)	−23 (−9)	−15 (5)	−13 (9)	−16 (3)	−26 (−15)	−34 (−29)	−36 (−33)	−40 (−40)	−30 (−22)
Mean daily minimum °C (°F)	−48 (−54)	−46 (−51)	−45 (−49)	−40 (−40)	−30 (−22)	−19 (−2)	−15 (5)	−21 (−6)	−29 (−20)	−39 (−38)	−42 (−44)	−48 (−54)	−35 (−31)
Record low °C (°F)	−61.2 (−78.2)	−63.9 (−83.0)	−67.2 (−89.0)	−57.3 (−71.1)	−47.4 (−53.3)	−37.5 (−35.5)	−33.0 (−27.4)	−39.2 (−38.6)	−46.0 (−50.8)	−51.4 (−60.5)	−60.0 (−76.0)	−69.6 (−93.3)	−69.6 (−93.3)
Source: (September record)

== Transport ==
During the summer months, the station is accessed via Kangerlussuaq Airport with LC-130 Hercules aircraft which land on a 4,572 by 60 m (15,000 by 197 ft) snow runway, which is prepared and regularly groomed for ski-equipped aircraft. Winter access is infrequent, using smaller, ski-equipped aircraft such as Twin Otter flown by Kenn Borek Air.

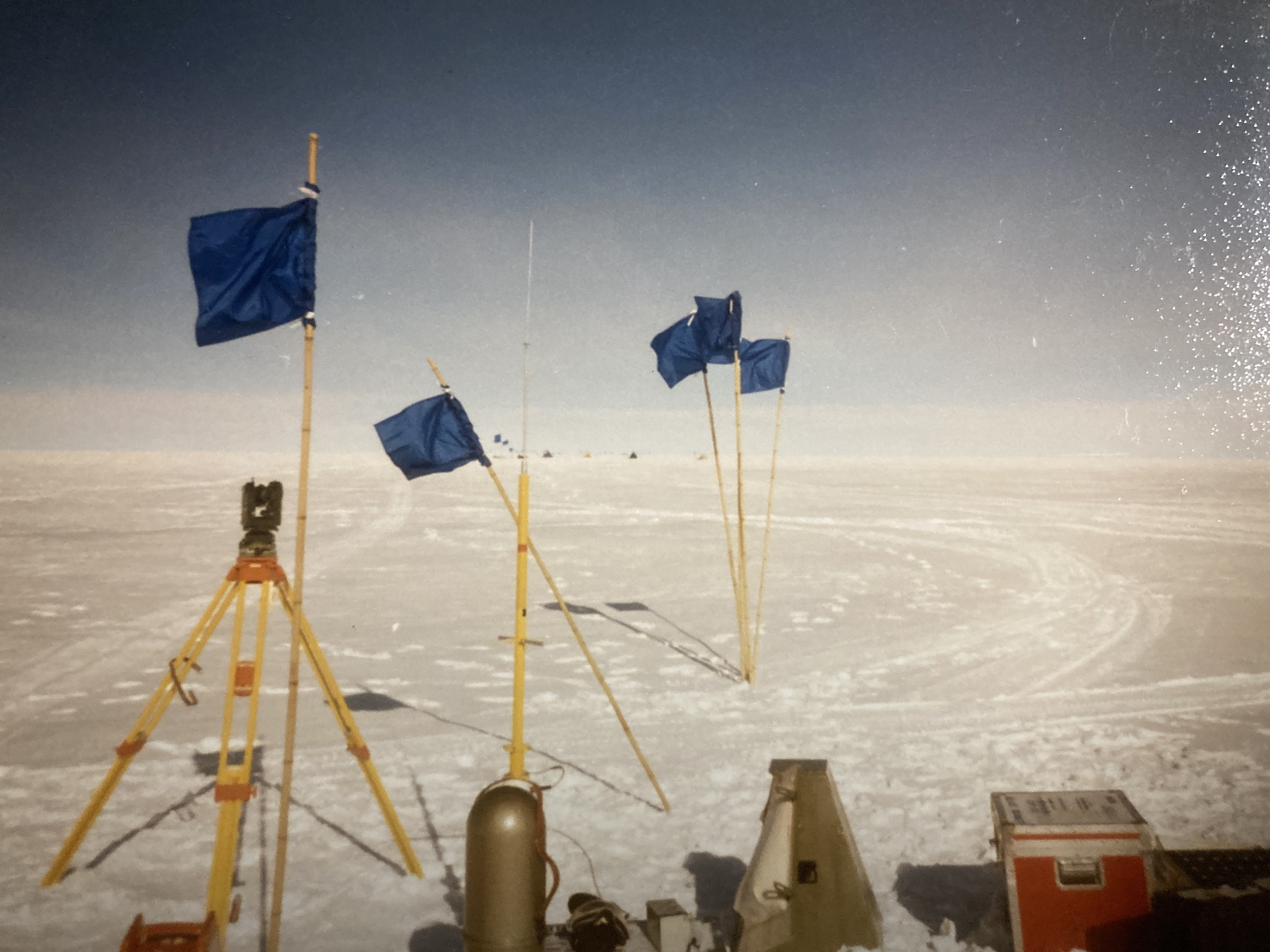
Laying out the first runway, 1989

== See also ==
- Camp Century – American military base in Greenland (1959–1967)
- Eismitte – Meteorological station in Greenland
- List of mountains in Greenland
- List of research stations in the Arctic
- NEEM Camp – Research facility on the northern Greenland Ice Sheet
- North Ice – Research station in Greenland (1952–1954)
