= Greenland Telescope =

Radio Telescope

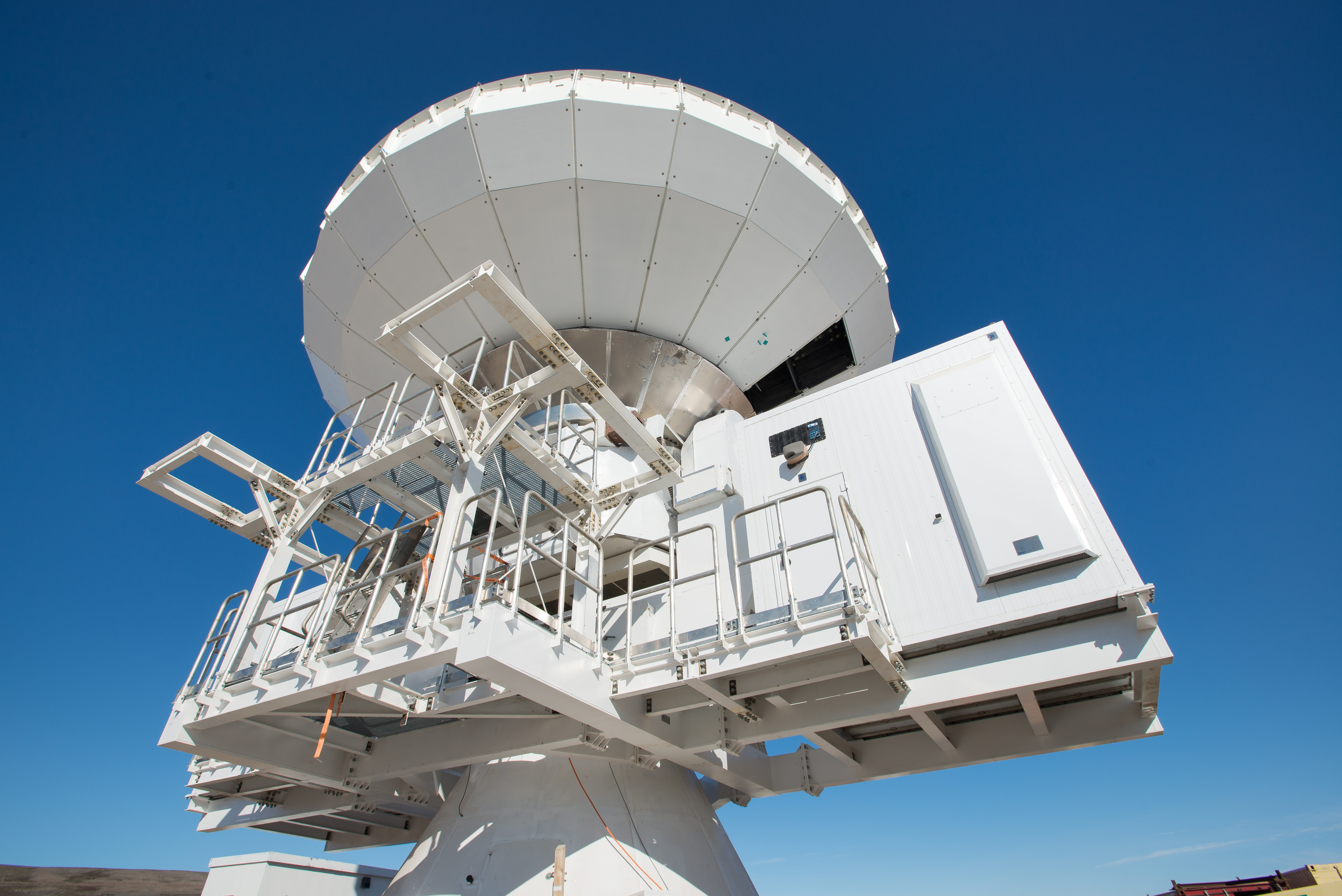
- Alternative names: GLT
- Location(s): Greenland. Currently located at the Pituffik Space Base but will be deployed at the Summit Station in the center of Greenland.
- Coordinates: 76°32′06″N 68°41′09″W
- Diameter: 12 m (39 ft 4 in)
- Website: www.cfa.harvard.edu/greenland12m/
- Location of Greenland Telescope
- Related media on Commons

The Greenland Telescope is a radio telescope situated at the Pituffik Space Base in north-western Greenland. It will later be deployed at the Summit Station research camp, located at the highest point of the Greenland ice sheet at an altitude of 3,210 meters (10,530 feet).

The telescope is an international collaboration between:

- The Academia Sinica Institute of Astronomy and Astrophysics (Taiwan) (project leaders)
- The Smithsonian Astrophysical Observatory of the Center for Astrophysics | Harvard & Smithsonian (United States)
- The National Radio Astronomy Observatory (United States)
- The Haystack Observatory of the Massachusetts Institute of Technology (United States)

In 2011 the U.S. National Science Foundation gave the Smithsonian Astrophysical Observatory a 12-meter radio antenna that had been used as a prototype for the ALMA project in Chile. The antenna was to be deployed in Greenland. Deploying the telescope in the middle of Greenland is ideal for detecting certain radio frequencies.

The telescope will be used to study the event horizons of black holes and to test how general relativity behaves in environments with extreme gravity.

The Greenland Telescope will become part of the global network of telescopes that makes up the Event Horizon Telescope that will study supermassive black holes and explore the origin of the relativistic jet in the active galaxy Messier 87.

== Progress and current status ==
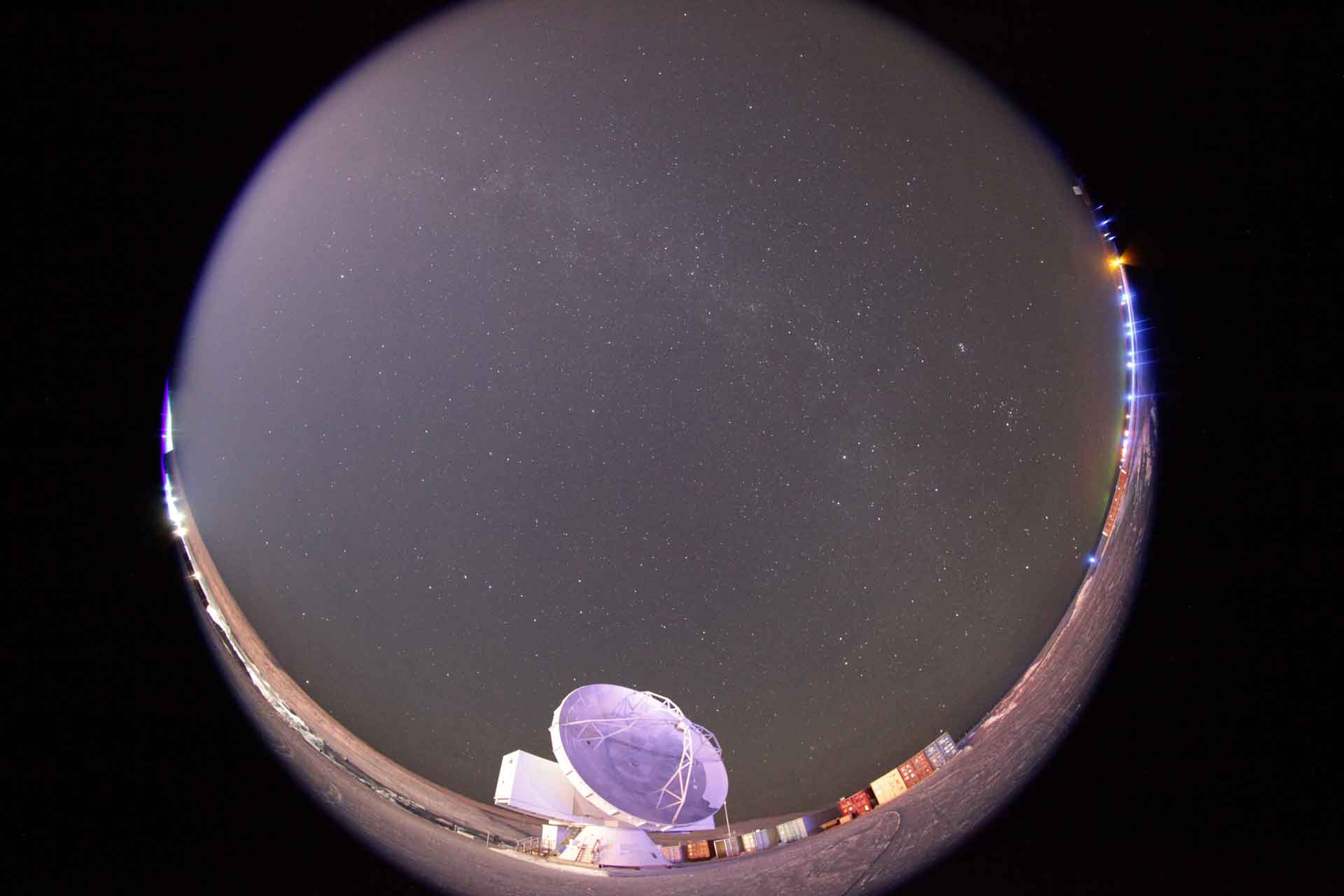
The Greenland Telescope in polar night, 2017

Between 2013 and 2015, after successful retrieval of the original telescope from New Mexico, the Taiwanese Academia Sinica Institute of Astronomy and Astrophysics modified the telescope in collaboration with the National Chung-Shan Institute of Science and Technology and China Steel so that it would better work in the cold environment of the Arctic. The modifications included equipment housings for the freezing conditions, deicing mechanisms and a renewed pedestal. The telescope was shipped to Greenland in July 2016 and re-assembled in July 2017 at Thule Air Base in north-western Greenland. The telescope took its first image on the 25th of December 2017.

An update on "Construction, Commissioning, and Operations" of the telescope at Pituffik Space Base (the revised name for the complex) was published on ArXiv in July 2023, describing "the lessons learned from the operations in the Arctic regions, and the prospect of the telescope." One of the systems tested was the location system; When the telescope is deployed on the ice cap summit, it will move with the ground it is mounted on. Establishing the telescope's geographical position to the required accuracy of 5m required about an hour of observation time. The snow and ice removal systems were also successfully tested.

The telescope will be deployed at the Summit Station research camp, located at the highest point of the Greenland ice sheet.

== Additional sources ==
- Hirashita, Hiroyuki; Koch, Patrick M.; Matsushita, Satoki; Takakuwa, Shigehisa; Nakamura, Masanori; Asada, Keiichi; Liu, Hauyu Baobab; Urata, Yuji; Wang, Ming-Jye; Wang, Wei-Hao; Takahashi, Satoko; Tang, Ya-Wen; Chang, Hsian-Hong; Huang, Kuiyun; Morata, Oscar; Otsuka, Masaaki; Lin, Kai-Yang; Tsai, An-Li; Lin, Yen-Ting; Srinivasan, Sundar; Martin-Cocher, Pierre; Pu, Hung-Yi; Kemper, Francisca; Patel, Nimesh; Grimes, Paul; Huang, Yau-De; Han, Chih-Chiang; Huang, Yen-Ru; Nishioka, Hiroaki; Lin, Lupin Chun-Che; Zhang, Qizhou; Keto, Eric; Burgos, Roberto; Chen, Ming-Tang; Inoue, Makoto; Ho, Paul T. P.. "First-generation science cases for ground-based terahertz telescopes". Publications of the Astronomical Society of Japan, 2016: Volume 68, Issue 1, id.R1 pp. doi:10.1093/pasj/psv115 10.1093/pasj/psv115
- The M87 Workshop: Towards the 100th Anniversary of the Discovery of Cosmic Jets
- Urata, Yuji; Huang, Kuiyun; Asada, Keiichi; Hirashita, Hiroyuki; Inoue, Makoto; Ho, Paul T. P. (2015). "A New Era of Submillimeter GRB Afterglow Follow-Ups with the Greenland Telescope". Advances in Astronomy. 2015 165030. arXiv:1503.07594. Bibcode:2015AdAst2015E..12U. doi:10.1155/2015/165030.
- Arctic Greenland Telescope Opens New Era of Astronomy SpaceRef, 2018-05-31.
