= William T. Freeman =

American computer scientist

William Freeman
- Born: William T. Freeman; 1957 (age 68–69)
- Citizenship: United States
- Education: Stanford University; MIT
- Awards: ACM Fellow
- Scientific career
- Fields: Computer Vision
- Workplaces: Massachusetts Institute of Technology
- Doctoral advisor: Edward Adelson
- Doctoral students: Katie Bouman
- Website: billf.mit.edu

William T. Freeman is the Thomas and Gerd Perkins Professor of electrical engineering and computer science at the Massachusetts Institute of Technology. He is known for contributions to computer vision.

== Education ==
Freeman received his undergraduate degree in physics from Stanford University in 1979, and his Ph.D. from MIT in 1992.

== Career and research ==
Freeman worked at Mitsubishi Electric Research Labs before joining the faculty at MIT in 2001, where he is currently Thomas and Gerd Perkins Professor of electrical engineering and computer science. He served as the Associate Department Head from 2011 to 2014.

Freeman's research interests include machine learning applied to computer vision, Bayesian models of visual perception, and computational photography. He has also made research contributions on steerable filters and pyramids, orientation histograms, the generic viewpoint assumption, color constancy, computer vision for computer games, and belief propagation in networks with loops. He received outstanding paper awards at computer vision or machine learning conferences in 1997, 2006, 2009 and 2012, and test-of-time awards for papers from 1990 and 1995.

In 1985 he invented, and in 1988 patented, a design for a three-sided zipper. The design was resurrected in 2025 by an MIT research team who showed that it was viable to construct using 3D printing.

=== Awards and honors ===
Freeman is a fellow of the Association for Computing Machinery (ACM), the Institute of Electrical and Electronics Engineers (IEEE) and the Association for the Advancement of Artificial Intelligence (AAAI). In 2019 he received the PAMI Distinguished Researcher Award from the Computer Vision Foundation.

He was involved in the multinational Event Horizon Telescope Collaboration which in 2019 published the first images of a black hole. The collaboration received the 2020 Breakthrough Prize in Fundamental Physics; the $3 million prize was split between 347 co-recipients.

In 2021, he was elected to the National Academy of Engineering for contributions in computer science and engineering.
