= Charles Bouman =

American academic

- Born: Charles Addison Bouman Jr.
- Education: University of Pennsylvania; University of California at Berkeley; Princeton University
- Children: Katie Bouman; Amanda Bouman; Alexander Bouman
- Awards: Raymond C. Bowman Award from the Society for Imaging Science and Technology (2003)
- Scientific career
- Fields: Electrical engineering
- Workplaces: Purdue University
- Thesis: Hierarchical modeling and processing of images (1989)
- Doctoral advisor: Bede Liu

Charles Addison Bouman Jr. (/ˈboʊmən/) is the Showalter Professor of Electrical and Computer Engineering and Biomedical Engineering at Purdue University, where he has taught since 1989. His research focuses on applications of image processing in various contexts, including medicine, materials science, and consumer imaging. His work led to the development of the first commercial CT scan technology to use model-based iterative reconstruction. He is a co-inventor on over fifty patents in the field of consumer imaging. He is a member of the National Academy of Inventors, as well as a fellow of the Institute of Electrical and Electronics Engineers, the American Institute for Medical and Biological Engineering, the Society for Imaging Science and Technology, and SPIE. He was formerly the editor-in-chief of IEEE Transactions on Image Processing.

He is the father of computational imaging scientist Katie Bouman.

As of October 31, 2025, he is one of Purdue University's two Showalter Distinguished Professors along with Kinam Park, a position supported by the Ralph W. and Grace M. Showalter Research Trust.

== Fusing Sensor Models with Machine Learning Models ==
Bouman is the lead author of what has been described as a "Plug-n-Play" method for fusing sensor models and machine-learning models for joint optimization of the two for the generation of images from noisy and incomplete projection data.
