= You-Hua Chu =

US and Taiwanese astronomer

- Born: 1953 (age 72–73); Taiwan
- Citizenship: United States
- Education: National Taiwan University (BS); University of California, Berkeley (PhD)
- Scientific career
- Fields: Astronomy
- Workplaces: Academia Sinica; University of Illinois at Urbana-Champaign
- Website: https://www.asiaa.sinica.edu.tw/people/cv.php?i=yhchu

You-Hua Chu (Chinese: 朱有花; born in 1953) is a Taiwanese astrophysicist. She has served as the director of the Institute of Astronomy and Astrophysics, Academia Sinica and the chair of the Department of Astronomy at the University of Illinois at Urbana-Champaign. Her main research areas are interactions between the interstellar medium and stars and observations of planetary systems in the post main sequence stages.

== Life ==
After graduating from Taipei First Girls' High School in 1971, Chu earned her B.S. in physics from National Taiwan University in 1975 and her Ph.D. in astronomy from the University of California, Berkeley, in 1981.

From 2005 to 2011, she served as chair of the Department of Astronomy at the University of Illinois at Urbana-Champaign, where she is currently a professor emeritus.

In September 2014, You-Hua Chu became the director of the Institute of Astronomy and Astrophysics, Academia Sinica. She was the first female astronomer to fill this position.

You-Hua Chu has two daughters and a son.

== Honors and awards ==
Between 2009 and 2012, You-Hua Chu was president of Division VI (Interstellar Matter) of the International Astronomical Union. She received the Outstanding Alumni Award from Department of Physics in the National Taiwan University in 2016. In February 2021, You-Hua Chu was elected as American Astronomical Society (AAS) Fellow. On 16 June 2021, the International Astronomical Union named asteroid 461981 "You-Hua Chu" in recognition of her astronomical achievements. During the 2022 Scientific Assembly Meeting of the Astronomical Society of the Republic of China (Taiwan) on October 2, the Society presented the 6th Heaven Quest Award to You-Hua Chu. On that occasion, the National Central University presented her the asteroid inscription for her outstanding contributions to astronomical research. In December 2022, You-Hua Chu was elected Fellow of the Physical Society of Taiwan. In April 2023, the Canadian Astronomical Society choose her as the 2023 R.M. Petrie Prize Lecturer in view of her strong leadership and expertise.

== Research ==
You-Hua Chu studies interactions between stars and the interstellar medium, using multi-wavelength observations from radio to gamma rays. For example, stars of different types (massive O-type stars, evolved Wolf-Rayet stars, young white dwarfs) blow a strong wind able to carve bubbles in the interstellar medium. Such bubbles can appear around single (or a few stars) but also around clusters where the collective stellar action creates large structures called "superbubbles" or "supershells". You-Hua Chu has pioneered the studies of such features in several ways. She notably helped identifying them, derived their kinematics with optical spectra to constrain the energy feedback and physics at the interfaces, and analyzed in detail their X-ray emission. In this context, she was the first to report on the presence of X-rays from the central star as well as hot (1.7 MK), diffuse gas associated to Cat's eye planetary nebula.

Her work was publicized in several press releases.

You-Hua Chu studies the origins of Type Ia supernovae. It is not clear whether Type Ia supernovae originate from the single degenerate scenario or the double degenerate scenario. If a surviving companion or the circumstellar medium from the progenitor’s mass loss is detected, the origin of single degenerate scenario for a Type Ia supernova can be affirmed. You-Hua Chu organized a team to use the Hubble Space Telescope to search for a surviving companion star within Type Ia supernova remnants in the Large Magellanic Cloud. The results show that the single degenerate scenario for Type Ia supernovae can be more prevalent than people previously thought in the Milky Way.

== Professional and academic societies ==
- Member, American Astronomical Society
- Member, International Astronomical Union
- Member, Astronomical Society of Republic of China (Taiwan)
