= Jan Högbom =

Swedish astronomer and university professor (born 1929)

- Born: Jan Arvid Högbom; October 3, 1929 (age 96)
- Education: University of Cambridge (PhD)
- Known for: CLEAN algorithm
- Scientific career
- Thesis: The structure and magnetic field of the solar corona (1959)
- Doctoral advisor: Martin Ryle

Jan Arvid Högbom (born 3 October 1929) is a Swedish radio astronomer and astrophysicist.

== Education ==
Högbom obtained his PhD in 1959 from the University of Cambridge with Martin Ryle.

== Career and research ==
Högbom is most well known for the development of the CLEAN algorithm for deconvolution of images created in radio astronomy, published in 1974. This allows the use of arrays of small antennae, generating incomplete sampling data, to effectively simulate a much larger aperture. Högbom was also the first to use Earth rotation synthesis imaging in a small test.

These methods pioneered by Högbom are still extensively used and combined, e.g. in the imaging of the central supermassive black hole of the Messier 87 galaxy.

=== Awards and honours ===
Högbom was elected member of the Royal Swedish Academy of Sciences in 1981.
