= CLEAN (algorithm) =

Computational algorithm for radio astronomy

The CLEAN algorithm is a computational algorithm to perform a deconvolution on images created in radio astronomy. It was published by Jan Högbom in 1974 and several variations have been proposed since then.

The algorithm assumes that the image consists of a number of point sources. It will iteratively find the highest value in the image and subtract a small gain of this point source convolved with the point spread function ("dirty beam") of the observation, until the highest value is smaller than some threshold.

Astronomer T. J. Cornwell writes, "The impact of CLEAN on radio astronomy has been immense", both directly in enabling greater speed and efficiency in observations, and indirectly by encouraging "a wave of innovation in synthesis processing that continues to this day." It has also been applied in other areas of astronomy and many other fields of science.

While the CLEAN algorithm and its variations are still extensively used in radio astronomy, the first imaging of the M87 central supermassive black hole by the Event Horizon Telescope adopted new a technique called "regularized maximum likelihood". Rather than a deconvolution, the maximum likelihood methods are "forward": they estimate an optimal image based on an objective function.
