= Academia Sinica Institute of Astronomy and Astrophysics =

Astronomical research institute in Taiwan

Coordinates: 25.021278°N 121.538139°E

Academia Sinica Institute of Astronomy and Astrophysics 中央研究院天文及天文物理研究所
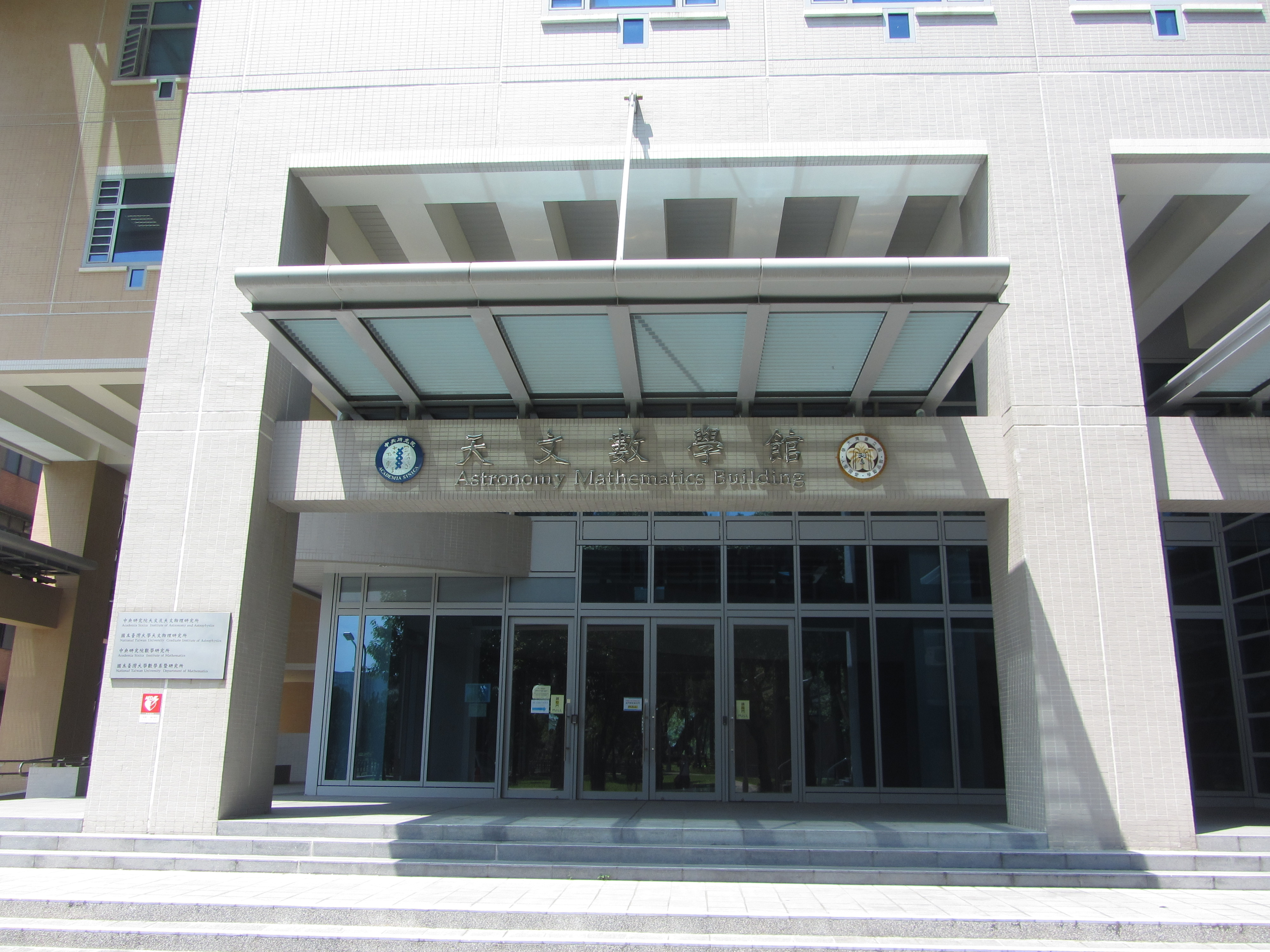
- Astronomy-Mathematics Building on the Campus of National Taiwan University.
- Established: 2010, 10 years ago
- Director: Ue-Li Pen
- Address: 11F of Astronomy-Mathematics Building, AS/NTU. No.1, Sec. 4, Roosevelt Rd, Taipei 10617, Taiwan
- Location: Taipei, Taiwan
- Website: asiaa.sinica.edu.tw

The Academia Sinica Institute of Astronomy and Astrophysics (ASIAA or IAA) is an affiliated research institute of Academia Sinica in Taipei.

ASIAA is currently located in the Astronomy and Mathematics Building at the National Taiwan University in Taipei, Taiwan and also has a field office in Hilo, Hawaii.

ASIAA was officially established on June 1, 2010, with Paul Ho being the first director.

== Research ==
The research areas of ASIAA range from the Solar System to star formation to galaxies and cosmology. ASIAA has either led or co-led the construction and operation of several telescopes, including the AMiBA Telescope to study the cosmic microwave background radiation (also known as "Lee Array"), the Taiwanese-American Occultation Survey, the Submillimeter Array and many other research projects.

== Projects ==
ASIAA is involved in several research projects, including:

- Taiwanese–American Occultation Survey (TAOS)
- Transneptunian Automated Occultation Survey (TAOS II)
- Yuan Tseh Lee Array for Microwave Background Anisotropy (AMiBA)
- Theoretical Institute for Advanced Research in Astrophysics (TIARA)
- Hyper Suprime-Cam (HSC) Survey
- Atacama Large Millimeter/submillimeter Array (ALMA)
- The Greenland Telescope
- Space Infrared Telescope for Cosmology and Astrophysics (SPICA)

== Observatories ==
ASIAA has access to several observatories:

- Submillimeter Array (SMA)
- Canada-France-Hawaii Telescope (CFHT)
- Subaru Telescope
- The Greenland Telescope

== Directors ==
=== Directors for the re-establishment of ASIAA ===
- Typhoon Lee (1993–1994)
- Chi Yuan (1994–1997)
- Fred Lo (1997 – 2002 August)
- Paul Ho (September 2002 – August 2003)
- Sun Kwok (September 2003 – 2005 August)
- Paul Ho (September 2005 – May 2010)

=== Directors of ASIAA ===
- Paul Ho (June 2010 – August 2014)
- You-Hua Chu (September 2014 – August 2020)
- Shiang-Yu Wang (acting director) (September 2020 – August 2021)
- Ue-Li Pen (September 2021 – present)

== See also ==
- Academia Sinica
