= List of minor planets: 630001–631000 =

The following is a partial list of minor planets, running from minor-planet number 630001 through 631000, inclusive. The primary data for this and other partial lists is based on JPL's "Small-Body Orbital Elements" and data available from the Minor Planet Center. Critical list information is also provided by the MPC, unless otherwise specified from Lowell Observatory. A detailed description of the table's columns and additional sources are given on the main page including a complete list of every page in this series, and a statistical break-up on the dynamical classification of minor planets.

Also see the summary list of all named bodies in numerical and alphabetical order, and the corresponding naming citations for the number range of this particular list. New namings may only be added to this list after official publication, as the preannouncement of names is condemned by the Working Group for Small Bodies Nomenclature of the International Astronomical Union.

Near-Earth obj.	MBA (inner)	MBA (outer)	Centaur
Mars-crosser	MBA (middle)	Jupiter trojan	Trans-Neptunian obj.
Unclassified

== 630001–630100 ==
Designation			Discovery			Properties		Ref
Permanent	Provisional	Named after	Date	Site	Discoverer(s)	Category	Diam.	Ref
630001	2004 RC_{128}	—	September 7, 2004	Kitt Peak	Spacewatch	PAD	1.2 km	MPC · JPL
630002	2004 RU_{129}	—	September 7, 2004	Kitt Peak	Spacewatch	·	1.3 km	MPC · JPL
630003	2004 RR_{132}	—	September 7, 2004	Kitt Peak	Spacewatch	·	1.1 km	MPC · JPL
630004	2004 RR_{133}	—	September 7, 2004	Kitt Peak	Spacewatch	(18466)	2.4 km	MPC · JPL
630005	2004 RT_{155}	—	September 10, 2004	Socorro	LINEAR	·	2.5 km	MPC · JPL
630006	2004 RE_{169}	—	September 8, 2004	Palomar	NEAT	·	1.9 km	MPC · JPL
630007	2004 RH_{202}	—	September 11, 2004	Kitt Peak	Spacewatch	·	1.8 km	MPC · JPL
630008	2004 RT_{212}	—	September 11, 2004	Socorro	LINEAR	EUN	1.4 km	MPC · JPL
630009	2004 RJ_{239}	—	September 10, 2004	Kitt Peak	Spacewatch	KOR	1.1 km	MPC · JPL
630010	2004 RH_{240}	—	September 22, 1995	Kitt Peak	Spacewatch	AGN	1.1 km	MPC · JPL
630011	2004 RY_{256}	—	September 9, 2004	Socorro	LINEAR	·	1.7 km	MPC · JPL
630012	2004 RG_{260}	—	September 10, 2004	Kitt Peak	Spacewatch	HOF	2.1 km	MPC · JPL
630013	2004 RV_{260}	—	September 10, 2004	Kitt Peak	Spacewatch	AGN	890 m	MPC · JPL
630014	2004 RL_{263}	—	September 10, 2004	Kitt Peak	Spacewatch	AGN	1.1 km	MPC · JPL
630015	2004 RD_{269}	—	September 11, 2004	Kitt Peak	Spacewatch	AEO	1.4 km	MPC · JPL
630016	2004 RP_{272}	—	September 11, 2004	Kitt Peak	Spacewatch	·	1.6 km	MPC · JPL
630017	2004 RW_{274}	—	September 11, 2004	Kitt Peak	Spacewatch	·	1.3 km	MPC · JPL
630018	2004 RV_{277}	—	September 13, 2004	Kitt Peak	Spacewatch	AGN	1.2 km	MPC · JPL
630019	2004 RP_{278}	—	September 15, 2004	Kitt Peak	Spacewatch	·	1.4 km	MPC · JPL
630020	2004 RU_{278}	—	September 15, 2004	Kitt Peak	Spacewatch	AGN	1.0 km	MPC · JPL
630021	2004 RA_{279}	—	September 15, 2004	Kitt Peak	Spacewatch	AGN	1.0 km	MPC · JPL
630022	2004 RC_{282}	—	September 15, 2004	Kitt Peak	Spacewatch	·	1.6 km	MPC · JPL
630023	2004 RS_{284}	—	September 15, 2004	Kitt Peak	Spacewatch	KOR	1.3 km	MPC · JPL
630024	2004 RA_{289}	—	September 11, 2004	Kitt Peak	Spacewatch	·	1.7 km	MPC · JPL
630025	2004 RG_{294}	—	September 11, 2004	Kitt Peak	Spacewatch	·	2.0 km	MPC · JPL
630026	2004 RL_{314}	—	September 15, 2004	Kitt Peak	Spacewatch	·	1.3 km	MPC · JPL
630027	2004 RK_{332}	—	September 14, 2004	Palomar	NEAT	·	2.2 km	MPC · JPL
630028	2004 RM_{361}	—	March 23, 2012	Mount Lemmon	Mount Lemmon Survey	·	1.6 km	MPC · JPL
630029	2004 RO_{363}	—	March 14, 2012	Mount Lemmon	Mount Lemmon Survey	·	1.7 km	MPC · JPL
630030	2004 RP_{363}	—	September 19, 1995	Kitt Peak	Spacewatch	HOF	2.2 km	MPC · JPL
630031	2004 RQ_{364}	—	October 16, 2009	Mount Lemmon	Mount Lemmon Survey	·	1.6 km	MPC · JPL
630032	2004 RF_{365}	—	September 12, 2004	Kitt Peak	Spacewatch	·	1.4 km	MPC · JPL
630033	2004 SB_{6}	—	September 17, 2004	Kitt Peak	Spacewatch	·	770 m	MPC · JPL
630034	2004 SC_{36}	—	September 17, 2004	Kitt Peak	Spacewatch	·	1.8 km	MPC · JPL
630035	2004 SC_{64}	—	September 12, 2007	Mount Lemmon	Mount Lemmon Survey	·	500 m	MPC · JPL
630036	2004 SA_{65}	—	September 23, 2004	Kitt Peak	Spacewatch	·	3.3 km	MPC · JPL
630037	2004 SH_{65}	—	September 24, 2004	Kitt Peak	Spacewatch	NYS	890 m	MPC · JPL
630038	2004 TL_{9}	—	October 6, 2004	Three Buttes	Jones, G. R.	V	670 m	MPC · JPL
630039	2004 TF_{89}	—	October 5, 2004	Kitt Peak	Spacewatch	·	1.7 km	MPC · JPL
630040	2004 TE_{101}	—	April 28, 2003	Kitt Peak	Spacewatch	·	1.1 km	MPC · JPL
630041	2004 TB_{157}	—	October 6, 2004	Kitt Peak	Spacewatch	·	1.5 km	MPC · JPL
630042	2004 TM_{157}	—	October 6, 2004	Kitt Peak	Spacewatch	·	2.5 km	MPC · JPL
630043	2004 TC_{188}	—	October 7, 2004	Kitt Peak	Spacewatch	KOR	910 m	MPC · JPL
630044	2004 TA_{189}	—	October 7, 2004	Kitt Peak	Spacewatch	·	1.9 km	MPC · JPL
630045	2004 TV_{199}	—	October 7, 2004	Kitt Peak	Spacewatch	·	2.3 km	MPC · JPL
630046	2004 TE_{217}	—	October 5, 2004	Kitt Peak	Spacewatch	·	1.8 km	MPC · JPL
630047	2004 TO_{235}	—	October 4, 2004	Kitt Peak	Spacewatch	·	2.1 km	MPC · JPL
630048	2004 TN_{246}	—	October 7, 2004	Kitt Peak	Spacewatch	·	570 m	MPC · JPL
630049	2004 TJ_{251}	—	October 9, 2004	Kitt Peak	Spacewatch	·	1.7 km	MPC · JPL
630050	2004 TZ_{252}	—	October 9, 2004	Kitt Peak	Spacewatch	·	990 m	MPC · JPL
630051	2004 TE_{257}	—	September 5, 1999	Kitt Peak	Spacewatch	·	1.9 km	MPC · JPL
630052	2004 TE_{260}	—	October 7, 2004	Socorro	LINEAR	·	1.2 km	MPC · JPL
630053	2004 TQ_{269}	—	October 9, 2004	Kitt Peak	Spacewatch	·	540 m	MPC · JPL
630054	2004 TW_{270}	—	October 9, 2004	Kitt Peak	Spacewatch	·	650 m	MPC · JPL
630055	2004 TB_{330}	—	October 9, 2004	Kitt Peak	Spacewatch	·	1.8 km	MPC · JPL
630056	2004 TZ_{350}	—	October 10, 2004	Kitt Peak	Spacewatch	KOR	1.3 km	MPC · JPL
630057	2004 TB_{360}	—	October 10, 2004	Kitt Peak	Spacewatch	·	1.8 km	MPC · JPL
630058	2004 TD_{372}	—	April 14, 2007	Mount Lemmon	Mount Lemmon Survey	·	2.0 km	MPC · JPL
630059	2004 TE_{372}	—	October 7, 2004	Kitt Peak	Spacewatch	·	1.2 km	MPC · JPL
630060	2004 TR_{372}	—	August 21, 2011	Haleakala	Pan-STARRS 1	·	1.0 km	MPC · JPL
630061	2004 TT_{372}	—	October 10, 2004	Kitt Peak	Spacewatch	·	580 m	MPC · JPL
630062	2004 TF_{373}	—	June 12, 2008	Kitt Peak	Spacewatch	·	1.7 km	MPC · JPL
630063	2004 TD_{377}	—	September 2, 2013	Mount Lemmon	Mount Lemmon Survey	HOF	1.8 km	MPC · JPL
630064	2004 TR_{378}	—	October 9, 2004	Kitt Peak	Spacewatch	·	2.2 km	MPC · JPL
630065	2004 TU_{378}	—	October 10, 2004	Kitt Peak	Deep Ecliptic Survey	·	970 m	MPC · JPL
630066	2004 TF_{379}	—	April 13, 2012	Haleakala	Pan-STARRS 1	·	2.2 km	MPC · JPL
630067	2004 TW_{383}	—	March 10, 2016	Mount Lemmon	Mount Lemmon Survey	·	1.7 km	MPC · JPL
630068	2004 TY_{383}	—	April 20, 2012	Mount Lemmon	Mount Lemmon Survey	·	1.7 km	MPC · JPL
630069	2004 UL_{11}	—	October 23, 2004	Kitt Peak	Spacewatch	·	1.1 km	MPC · JPL
630070	2004 VH_{17}	—	October 8, 2004	Kitt Peak	Spacewatch	MAS	700 m	MPC · JPL
630071	2004 VH_{33}	—	November 3, 2004	Kitt Peak	Spacewatch	·	1.4 km	MPC · JPL
630072	2004 VS_{52}	—	November 4, 2004	Catalina	CSS	·	2.9 km	MPC · JPL
630073	2004 VB_{56}	—	November 2, 2000	Kitt Peak	Spacewatch	V	570 m	MPC · JPL
630074	2004 VO_{68}	—	January 13, 1996	Kitt Peak	Spacewatch	KOR	1.4 km	MPC · JPL
630075	2004 VJ_{84}	—	November 10, 2004	Kitt Peak	Spacewatch	BRA	1.8 km	MPC · JPL
630076	2004 VJ_{87}	—	November 11, 2004	Kitt Peak	Spacewatch	·	1.5 km	MPC · JPL
630077	2004 VQ_{104}	—	November 9, 2004	Mauna Kea	Veillet, C.	·	1.4 km	MPC · JPL
630078	2004 VS_{104}	—	November 3, 2004	Kitt Peak	Spacewatch	KOR	1.4 km	MPC · JPL
630079	2004 VT_{105}	—	October 10, 2004	Kitt Peak	Deep Ecliptic Survey	AGN	1.3 km	MPC · JPL
630080	2004 VZ_{106}	—	November 4, 2004	Catalina	CSS	·	2.3 km	MPC · JPL
630081	2004 VH_{129}	—	October 18, 2004	Kitt Peak	Deep Ecliptic Survey	·	580 m	MPC · JPL
630082	2004 WN_{13}	—	July 3, 2011	Mount Lemmon	Mount Lemmon Survey	·	1.2 km	MPC · JPL
630083	2004 XY_{41}	—	December 12, 2004	Kitt Peak	Spacewatch	·	1.4 km	MPC · JPL
630084	2004 XC_{47}	—	December 9, 2004	Kitt Peak	Spacewatch	·	1.7 km	MPC · JPL
630085	2004 XC_{58}	—	December 10, 2004	Kitt Peak	Spacewatch	·	1.3 km	MPC · JPL
630086	2004 XH_{68}	—	December 3, 2004	Kitt Peak	Spacewatch	·	1.5 km	MPC · JPL
630087	2004 XC_{91}	—	December 11, 2004	Kitt Peak	Spacewatch	KOR	1.6 km	MPC · JPL
630088	2004 XT_{97}	—	December 11, 2004	Kitt Peak	Spacewatch	KOR	1.4 km	MPC · JPL
630089	2004 XC_{108}	—	September 18, 2003	Palomar	NEAT	·	1.9 km	MPC · JPL
630090	2004 XM_{115}	—	December 11, 2004	Kitt Peak	Spacewatch	KOR	1.4 km	MPC · JPL
630091	2004 XU_{117}	—	December 3, 2004	Kitt Peak	Spacewatch	·	1.3 km	MPC · JPL
630092	2004 XS_{158}	—	December 14, 2004	Kitt Peak	Spacewatch	L5	10 km	MPC · JPL
630093	2004 XH_{175}	—	December 11, 2004	Kitt Peak	Spacewatch	KOR	1.7 km	MPC · JPL
630094	2004 XH_{176}	—	December 11, 2004	Kitt Peak	Spacewatch	·	1.4 km	MPC · JPL
630095	2004 XO_{190}	—	December 15, 2004	Mauna Kea	P. A. Wiegert, D. D. Balam	EOS	1.7 km	MPC · JPL
630096	2004 XZ_{191}	—	February 26, 2007	Kitt Peak	Spacewatch	HOF	2.2 km	MPC · JPL
630097	2004 XL_{196}	—	October 18, 2007	Mount Lemmon	Mount Lemmon Survey	·	1.3 km	MPC · JPL
630098	2004 YG_{34}	—	September 17, 1998	Kitt Peak	Spacewatch	KOR	1.5 km	MPC · JPL
630099	2004 YC_{36}	—	December 14, 2004	Kitt Peak	Spacewatch	EOS	2.2 km	MPC · JPL
630100	2004 YE_{38}	—	September 24, 2011	Haleakala	Pan-STARRS 1	·	1.4 km	MPC · JPL

== 630101–630200 ==
back to top

Designation			Discovery			Properties		Ref
Permanent	Provisional	Named after	Date	Site	Discoverer(s)	Category	Diam.	Ref
630101	2004 YQ_{40}	—	December 2, 2005	Mauna Kea	A. Boattini	·	1.7 km	MPC · JPL
630102	2004 YW_{40}	—	December 19, 2004	Mount Lemmon	Mount Lemmon Survey	L5	9.5 km	MPC · JPL
630103	2004 YF_{42}	—	December 20, 2004	Mount Lemmon	Mount Lemmon Survey	L5	8.7 km	MPC · JPL
630104	2005 AD_{4}	—	January 6, 2005	Catalina	CSS	·	1.4 km	MPC · JPL
630105	2005 AX_{40}	—	December 18, 2004	Kitt Peak	Spacewatch	·	1.3 km	MPC · JPL
630106	2005 AE_{52}	—	January 13, 2005	Kitt Peak	Spacewatch	·	1.5 km	MPC · JPL
630107	2005 AQ_{54}	—	December 16, 2004	Catalina	CSS	·	1.7 km	MPC · JPL
630108	2005 AR_{55}	—	December 20, 2004	Mount Lemmon	Mount Lemmon Survey	·	1.9 km	MPC · JPL
630109	2005 AU_{62}	—	January 13, 2005	Kitt Peak	Spacewatch	·	2.2 km	MPC · JPL
630110	2005 AL_{72}	—	January 15, 2005	Kitt Peak	Spacewatch	·	2.4 km	MPC · JPL
630111	2005 AH_{83}	—	December 4, 2012	Mount Lemmon	Mount Lemmon Survey	·	1.6 km	MPC · JPL
630112	2005 AX_{83}	—	January 22, 2013	Kitt Peak	Spacewatch	·	1.1 km	MPC · JPL
630113	2005 BP_{4}	—	January 16, 2005	Socorro	LINEAR	EOS	2.2 km	MPC · JPL
630114	2005 BZ_{33}	—	October 2, 2003	Kitt Peak	Spacewatch	·	1.3 km	MPC · JPL
630115	2005 BW_{35}	—	November 15, 1995	Kitt Peak	Spacewatch	(5)	1.2 km	MPC · JPL
630116	2005 BJ_{50}	—	January 16, 2005	Kitt Peak	Spacewatch	L5	10 km	MPC · JPL
630117	2005 BQ_{50}	—	May 3, 2009	Mount Lemmon	Mount Lemmon Survey	L5	10 km	MPC · JPL
630118	2005 BW_{53}	—	January 8, 2010	Kitt Peak	Spacewatch	EOS	1.8 km	MPC · JPL
630119	2005 BC_{54}	—	February 18, 2015	Haleakala	Pan-STARRS 1	·	480 m	MPC · JPL
630120	2005 BN_{55}	—	July 27, 2011	Haleakala	Pan-STARRS 1	L5	7.2 km	MPC · JPL
630121	2005 CE_{3}	—	February 1, 2005	Kitt Peak	Spacewatch	EOS	1.9 km	MPC · JPL
630122	2005 CJ_{29}	—	February 1, 2005	Kitt Peak	Spacewatch	·	1.0 km	MPC · JPL
630123	2005 CW_{30}	—	February 1, 2005	Kitt Peak	Spacewatch	·	1.9 km	MPC · JPL
630124	2005 CD_{54}	—	February 4, 2005	Kitt Peak	Spacewatch	·	630 m	MPC · JPL
630125	2005 CG_{56}	—	February 4, 2005	Mount Lemmon	Mount Lemmon Survey	VER	2.8 km	MPC · JPL
630126	2005 CH_{72}	—	February 1, 2005	Kitt Peak	Spacewatch	·	1.2 km	MPC · JPL
630127	2005 CW_{81}	—	February 9, 2005	La Silla	A. Boattini	·	1.1 km	MPC · JPL
630128	2005 CC_{85}	—	February 9, 2005	Mount Lemmon	Mount Lemmon Survey	·	2.4 km	MPC · JPL
630129	2005 CT_{87}	—	February 20, 2009	Kitt Peak	Spacewatch	·	840 m	MPC · JPL
630130	2005 CF_{88}	—	February 2, 2005	Kitt Peak	Spacewatch	·	1.1 km	MPC · JPL
630131	2005 DM_{1}	—	February 17, 2005	La Silla	A. Boattini	·	1.7 km	MPC · JPL
630132	2005 EE_{7}	—	March 1, 2005	Kitt Peak	Spacewatch	EOS	2.2 km	MPC · JPL
630133	2005 EQ_{15}	—	March 3, 2005	Kitt Peak	Spacewatch	·	1.1 km	MPC · JPL
630134	2005 EB_{56}	—	March 4, 2005	Kitt Peak	Spacewatch	·	2.8 km	MPC · JPL
630135	2005 EC_{64}	—	February 16, 2005	La Silla	A. Boattini	·	2.6 km	MPC · JPL
630136	2005 EH_{140}	—	March 10, 2005	Mount Lemmon	Mount Lemmon Survey	·	1.5 km	MPC · JPL
630137	2005 EF_{161}	—	March 9, 2005	Mount Lemmon	Mount Lemmon Survey	EOS	2.1 km	MPC · JPL
630138	2005 EM_{162}	—	March 10, 2005	Mount Lemmon	Mount Lemmon Survey	THM	2.1 km	MPC · JPL
630139	2005 ER_{202}	—	March 10, 2005	Mount Lemmon	Mount Lemmon Survey	EOS	1.9 km	MPC · JPL
630140	2005 EQ_{234}	—	March 10, 2005	Mount Lemmon	Mount Lemmon Survey	·	1.1 km	MPC · JPL
630141	2005 EW_{235}	—	March 10, 2005	Mount Lemmon	Mount Lemmon Survey	EOS	1.8 km	MPC · JPL
630142	2005 EE_{240}	—	March 3, 2005	Kitt Peak	Spacewatch	·	1.9 km	MPC · JPL
630143	2005 EB_{243}	—	March 11, 2005	Kitt Peak	Spacewatch	PHO	920 m	MPC · JPL
630144	2005 EA_{252}	—	March 10, 2005	Mount Lemmon	Mount Lemmon Survey	·	2.6 km	MPC · JPL
630145	2005 EJ_{267}	—	March 13, 2005	Kitt Peak	Spacewatch	·	2.5 km	MPC · JPL
630146	2005 EA_{275}	—	March 8, 2005	Kitt Peak	Spacewatch	·	1.4 km	MPC · JPL
630147	2005 EQ_{301}	—	March 4, 2005	Mount Lemmon	Mount Lemmon Survey	·	2.9 km	MPC · JPL
630148	2005 EC_{303}	—	March 11, 2005	Kitt Peak	Deep Ecliptic Survey	·	2.5 km	MPC · JPL
630149	2005 EO_{308}	—	March 8, 2005	Mount Lemmon	Mount Lemmon Survey	·	700 m	MPC · JPL
630150	2005 EG_{321}	—	March 8, 2005	Mount Lemmon	Mount Lemmon Survey	·	2.8 km	MPC · JPL
630151	2005 EF_{326}	—	October 22, 2008	Kitt Peak	Spacewatch	·	2.5 km	MPC · JPL
630152	2005 EB_{333}	—	February 9, 2005	Mount Lemmon	Mount Lemmon Survey	·	2.7 km	MPC · JPL
630153	2005 ER_{333}	—	March 4, 2005	Mount Lemmon	Mount Lemmon Survey	3:2 · SHU	5.9 km	MPC · JPL
630154	2005 EE_{336}	—	August 17, 2012	Haleakala	Pan-STARRS 1	·	1.4 km	MPC · JPL
630155	2005 EG_{336}	—	September 17, 2012	Mount Lemmon	Mount Lemmon Survey	L5	7.5 km	MPC · JPL
630156	2005 EC_{337}	—	February 15, 2010	Kitt Peak	Spacewatch	·	1.7 km	MPC · JPL
630157	2005 EG_{344}	—	June 25, 2017	Haleakala	Pan-STARRS 1	EOS	1.4 km	MPC · JPL
630158	2005 EU_{345}	—	February 5, 2013	Mount Lemmon	Mount Lemmon Survey	(5)	1.1 km	MPC · JPL
630159	2005 EE_{346}	—	March 11, 2005	Mount Lemmon	Mount Lemmon Survey	EOS	1.6 km	MPC · JPL
630160	2005 FQ_{19}	—	March 17, 2005	Kitt Peak	Spacewatch	·	1.9 km	MPC · JPL
630161	2005 GR_{52}	—	April 2, 2005	Mount Lemmon	Mount Lemmon Survey	·	1.4 km	MPC · JPL
630162	2005 GF_{58}	—	April 6, 2005	Mount Lemmon	Mount Lemmon Survey	·	1.0 km	MPC · JPL
630163	2005 GC_{61}	—	April 2, 2005	Kitt Peak	Spacewatch	·	710 m	MPC · JPL
630164	2005 GS_{61}	—	March 10, 2005	Mount Lemmon	Mount Lemmon Survey	·	4.0 km	MPC · JPL
630165	2005 GB_{68}	—	February 25, 2015	Haleakala	Pan-STARRS 1	·	1.6 km	MPC · JPL
630166	2005 GY_{74}	—	April 5, 2005	Mount Lemmon	Mount Lemmon Survey	·	1.1 km	MPC · JPL
630167	2005 GQ_{91}	—	March 17, 2005	Mount Lemmon	Mount Lemmon Survey	EOS	1.7 km	MPC · JPL
630168	2005 GY_{98}	—	October 18, 2001	Palomar	NEAT	·	2.7 km	MPC · JPL
630169	2005 GP_{101}	—	April 9, 2005	Kitt Peak	Spacewatch	·	2.5 km	MPC · JPL
630170	2005 GN_{107}	—	April 2, 2005	Mount Lemmon	Mount Lemmon Survey	·	1.0 km	MPC · JPL
630171	2005 GN_{115}	—	April 11, 2005	Mount Lemmon	Mount Lemmon Survey	·	2.0 km	MPC · JPL
630172	2005 GV_{126}	—	April 11, 2005	Mount Lemmon	Mount Lemmon Survey	·	910 m	MPC · JPL
630173	2005 GC_{138}	—	April 11, 2005	Kitt Peak	Spacewatch	·	1.3 km	MPC · JPL
630174	2005 GT_{140}	—	April 13, 2005	Catalina	CSS	·	900 m	MPC · JPL
630175	2005 GJ_{145}	—	April 11, 2005	Kitt Peak	Spacewatch	·	1.1 km	MPC · JPL
630176	2005 GT_{156}	—	April 10, 2005	Mount Lemmon	Mount Lemmon Survey	(5)	1.0 km	MPC · JPL
630177	2005 GB_{162}	—	April 14, 2005	Kitt Peak	Spacewatch	·	3.0 km	MPC · JPL
630178	2005 GO_{164}	—	April 10, 2005	Mount Lemmon	Mount Lemmon Survey	·	1.4 km	MPC · JPL
630179	2005 GK_{165}	—	April 11, 2005	Kitt Peak	Spacewatch	EUN	1.0 km	MPC · JPL
630180	2005 GY_{165}	—	April 11, 2005	Mount Lemmon	Mount Lemmon Survey	EOS	1.6 km	MPC · JPL
630181	2005 GV_{183}	—	March 10, 2005	Mount Lemmon	Mount Lemmon Survey	·	2.7 km	MPC · JPL
630182	2005 GW_{190}	—	March 8, 2005	Mount Lemmon	Mount Lemmon Survey	THM	1.9 km	MPC · JPL
630183	2005 GP_{193}	—	April 10, 2005	Kitt Peak	Deep Ecliptic Survey	L5	7.3 km	MPC · JPL
630184	2005 GC_{207}	—	March 8, 2005	Mount Lemmon	Mount Lemmon Survey	·	1.1 km	MPC · JPL
630185	2005 GH_{208}	—	May 23, 2006	Kitt Peak	Spacewatch	EOS	2.4 km	MPC · JPL
630186	2005 GJ_{230}	—	April 12, 2005	Kitt Peak	Spacewatch	·	620 m	MPC · JPL
630187	2005 GL_{231}	—	September 15, 2013	Mount Lemmon	Mount Lemmon Survey	·	550 m	MPC · JPL
630188	2005 GL_{236}	—	October 6, 2007	Kitt Peak	Spacewatch	·	2.0 km	MPC · JPL
630189	2005 HU_{10}	—	October 2, 2006	Mount Lemmon	Mount Lemmon Survey	·	640 m	MPC · JPL
630190	2005 HW_{10}	—	November 9, 2013	Haleakala	Pan-STARRS 1	·	2.9 km	MPC · JPL
630191	2005 HB_{11}	—	February 7, 2015	Mount Lemmon	Mount Lemmon Survey	·	2.9 km	MPC · JPL
630192	2005 JE_{7}	—	May 4, 2005	Mauna Kea	Veillet, C.	·	2.3 km	MPC · JPL
630193	2005 JT_{10}	—	May 4, 2005	Mauna Kea	Veillet, C.	·	2.4 km	MPC · JPL
630194	2005 JJ_{29}	—	May 3, 2005	Kitt Peak	Spacewatch	·	770 m	MPC · JPL
630195	2005 JF_{40}	—	April 11, 2005	Mount Lemmon	Mount Lemmon Survey	·	620 m	MPC · JPL
630196	2005 JF_{49}	—	May 4, 2005	Kitt Peak	Spacewatch	·	750 m	MPC · JPL
630197	2005 JO_{84}	—	April 11, 2005	Kitt Peak	Spacewatch	·	2.1 km	MPC · JPL
630198	2005 JJ_{105}	—	May 11, 2005	Mount Lemmon	Mount Lemmon Survey	EMA	2.7 km	MPC · JPL
630199	2005 JP_{111}	—	May 9, 2005	Kitt Peak	Spacewatch	·	3.4 km	MPC · JPL
630200	2005 JO_{114}	—	May 10, 2005	Kitt Peak	Spacewatch	3:2	5.7 km	MPC · JPL

== 630201–630300 ==
back to top

Designation			Discovery			Properties		Ref
Permanent	Provisional	Named after	Date	Site	Discoverer(s)	Category	Diam.	Ref
630201	2005 JS_{115}	—	January 23, 2015	Haleakala	Pan-STARRS 1	·	1.7 km	MPC · JPL
630202	2005 JQ_{121}	—	May 10, 2005	Kitt Peak	Spacewatch	·	1.1 km	MPC · JPL
630203	2005 JX_{121}	—	May 10, 2005	Kitt Peak	Spacewatch	·	1.9 km	MPC · JPL
630204	2005 JO_{139}	—	June 5, 1995	Kitt Peak	Spacewatch	·	620 m	MPC · JPL
630205	2005 JX_{154}	—	April 17, 2005	Kitt Peak	Spacewatch	·	660 m	MPC · JPL
630206	2005 JM_{155}	—	April 17, 2005	Kitt Peak	Spacewatch	·	3.1 km	MPC · JPL
630207	2005 JF_{171}	—	May 10, 2005	Cerro Tololo	Deep Ecliptic Survey	·	1.6 km	MPC · JPL
630208	2005 JC_{176}	—	May 3, 2005	Catalina	CSS	JUN	1.2 km	MPC · JPL
630209	2005 JO_{187}	—	October 17, 2010	Mount Lemmon	Mount Lemmon Survey	EUN	960 m	MPC · JPL
630210	2005 JP_{187}	—	September 16, 2006	Catalina	CSS	·	2.3 km	MPC · JPL
630211	2005 JG_{190}	—	May 14, 2005	Mount Lemmon	Mount Lemmon Survey	·	1.3 km	MPC · JPL
630212	2005 JO_{190}	—	September 15, 2006	Kitt Peak	Spacewatch	·	1.4 km	MPC · JPL
630213	2005 JG_{193}	—	April 21, 2009	Mount Lemmon	Mount Lemmon Survey	MAR	1.1 km	MPC · JPL
630214	2005 JW_{193}	—	October 11, 2007	Kitt Peak	Spacewatch	·	2.4 km	MPC · JPL
630215	2005 KW_{1}	—	May 16, 2005	Mount Lemmon	Mount Lemmon Survey	KON	1.9 km	MPC · JPL
630216	2005 KF_{14}	—	May 21, 2005	Mount Lemmon	Mount Lemmon Survey	ADE	2.0 km	MPC · JPL
630217	2005 KN_{15}	—	October 12, 2007	Mount Lemmon	Mount Lemmon Survey	VER	2.7 km	MPC · JPL
630218	2005 LD_{7}	—	June 1, 2005	Kitt Peak	Spacewatch	·	1.3 km	MPC · JPL
630219	2005 LL_{19}	—	June 8, 2005	Kitt Peak	Spacewatch	(2076)	640 m	MPC · JPL
630220	2005 LS_{24}	—	February 16, 2004	Kitt Peak	Spacewatch	·	3.0 km	MPC · JPL
630221	2005 LA_{33}	—	May 14, 2005	Mount Lemmon	Mount Lemmon Survey	·	1.5 km	MPC · JPL
630222	2005 LX_{41}	—	June 13, 2005	Mount Lemmon	Mount Lemmon Survey	·	1.5 km	MPC · JPL
630223	2005 LK_{54}	—	June 13, 2005	Mount Lemmon	Mount Lemmon Survey	·	1.2 km	MPC · JPL
630224	2005 LZ_{54}	—	June 14, 2005	Kitt Peak	Spacewatch	·	3.3 km	MPC · JPL
630225	2005 LC_{55}	—	June 1, 2005	Kitt Peak	Spacewatch	·	3.1 km	MPC · JPL
630226	2005 LG_{58}	—	March 25, 2017	Haleakala	Pan-STARRS 1	·	1.1 km	MPC · JPL
630227	2005 LC_{59}	—	June 4, 2005	Kitt Peak	Spacewatch	EOS	1.6 km	MPC · JPL
630228	2005 MX	—	June 17, 2005	Mount Lemmon	Mount Lemmon Survey	(5)	1.2 km	MPC · JPL
630229	2005 MM_{5}	—	July 25, 2001	Haleakala	NEAT	·	1.7 km	MPC · JPL
630230	2005 MG_{6}	—	June 17, 2005	Mount Lemmon	Mount Lemmon Survey	·	830 m	MPC · JPL
630231	2005 ME_{13}	—	June 30, 2005	Kitt Peak	Spacewatch	EUN	1.3 km	MPC · JPL
630232	2005 MN_{24}	—	June 30, 2005	Kitt Peak	Spacewatch	·	2.8 km	MPC · JPL
630233	2005 MS_{34}	—	June 29, 2005	Palomar	NEAT	·	1.6 km	MPC · JPL
630234	2005 MW_{45}	—	July 5, 2005	Palomar	NEAT	·	1.3 km	MPC · JPL
630235	2005 MW_{55}	—	April 27, 2009	Mount Lemmon	Mount Lemmon Survey	·	1.4 km	MPC · JPL
630236	2005 MA_{56}	—	March 15, 2015	Haleakala	Pan-STARRS 1	·	740 m	MPC · JPL
630237	2005 MH_{56}	—	July 4, 2014	Haleakala	Pan-STARRS 1	EUN	1.1 km	MPC · JPL
630238	2005 NB_{4}	—	July 2, 2005	Kitt Peak	Spacewatch	V	580 m	MPC · JPL
630239	2005 NS_{7}	—	July 1, 2005	Kitt Peak	Spacewatch	·	3.5 km	MPC · JPL
630240	2005 NN_{28}	—	July 6, 2005	Kitt Peak	Spacewatch	·	1.7 km	MPC · JPL
630241	2005 NF_{29}	—	July 6, 2005	Kitt Peak	Spacewatch	·	3.3 km	MPC · JPL
630242	2005 NJ_{33}	—	July 5, 2005	Kitt Peak	Spacewatch	EOS	2.4 km	MPC · JPL
630243	2005 NZ_{36}	—	July 6, 2005	Kitt Peak	Spacewatch	·	1.6 km	MPC · JPL
630244	2005 NZ_{41}	—	July 5, 2005	Kitt Peak	Spacewatch	·	3.1 km	MPC · JPL
630245	2005 NE_{48}	—	July 7, 2005	Kitt Peak	Spacewatch	·	1.4 km	MPC · JPL
630246	2005 NM_{50}	—	October 3, 2002	Palomar	NEAT	·	770 m	MPC · JPL
630247	2005 NP_{58}	—	July 6, 2005	Kitt Peak	Spacewatch	·	1.4 km	MPC · JPL
630248	2005 NX_{73}	—	July 9, 2005	Kitt Peak	Spacewatch	·	1.9 km	MPC · JPL
630249	2005 NM_{88}	—	July 4, 2005	Mount Lemmon	Mount Lemmon Survey	·	1.2 km	MPC · JPL
630250	2005 NZ_{88}	—	July 4, 2005	Mount Lemmon	Mount Lemmon Survey	·	720 m	MPC · JPL
630251	2005 NA_{93}	—	July 5, 2005	Palomar	NEAT	PHO	2.3 km	MPC · JPL
630252	2005 NG_{94}	—	July 6, 2005	Kitt Peak	Spacewatch	·	1.4 km	MPC · JPL
630253	2005 NC_{126}	—	January 11, 2003	Kitt Peak	Spacewatch	·	1.8 km	MPC · JPL
630254	2005 NO_{127}	—	March 8, 2008	Mount Lemmon	Mount Lemmon Survey	·	750 m	MPC · JPL
630255	2005 NR_{127}	—	July 28, 2011	Haleakala	Pan-STARRS 1	·	3.3 km	MPC · JPL
630256	2005 NT_{127}	—	July 6, 2005	Kitt Peak	Spacewatch	·	3.0 km	MPC · JPL
630257	2005 NV_{129}	—	March 19, 2013	Haleakala	Pan-STARRS 1	PAD	1.4 km	MPC · JPL
630258	2005 NK_{130}	—	May 15, 2005	Mount Lemmon	Mount Lemmon Survey	·	1.5 km	MPC · JPL
630259	2005 OO_{4}	—	July 27, 2005	Palomar	NEAT	V	690 m	MPC · JPL
630260	2005 OT_{7}	—	November 12, 2001	Apache Point	SDSS Collaboration	·	2.0 km	MPC · JPL
630261	2005 OM_{18}	—	July 30, 2005	Palomar	NEAT	·	1.9 km	MPC · JPL
630262	2005 OL_{20}	—	July 11, 2005	Mount Lemmon	Mount Lemmon Survey	GEF	1.3 km	MPC · JPL
630263	2005 OW_{21}	—	July 29, 2005	Palomar	NEAT	·	1.6 km	MPC · JPL
630264	2005 OQ_{27}	—	July 19, 2005	Palomar	NEAT	·	1.2 km	MPC · JPL
630265	2005 OJ_{32}	—	October 22, 2009	Kitt Peak	Spacewatch	·	1.3 km	MPC · JPL
630266	2005 OS_{34}	—	July 31, 2005	Palomar	NEAT	·	2.1 km	MPC · JPL
630267	2005 PR_{7}	—	August 4, 2005	Palomar	NEAT	·	1.6 km	MPC · JPL
630268	2005 PG_{8}	—	August 4, 2005	Palomar	NEAT	·	1.1 km	MPC · JPL
630269	2005 PL_{12}	—	July 28, 2005	Palomar	NEAT	·	1.4 km	MPC · JPL
630270	2005 PB_{17}	—	August 12, 2005	Wrightwood	J. W. Young	V	710 m	MPC · JPL
630271	2005 PG_{29}	—	August 10, 2005	Siding Spring	SSS	·	3.7 km	MPC · JPL
630272	2005 QE_{4}	—	August 24, 2005	Palomar	NEAT	·	1.9 km	MPC · JPL
630273	2005 QH_{5}	—	August 22, 2005	Palomar	NEAT	·	3.7 km	MPC · JPL
630274	2005 QE_{7}	—	August 24, 2005	Palomar	NEAT	·	2.1 km	MPC · JPL
630275	2005 QH_{13}	—	August 6, 2005	Palomar	NEAT	·	730 m	MPC · JPL
630276	2005 QB_{16}	—	February 9, 2003	Haleakala	NEAT	HNS	1.4 km	MPC · JPL
630277	2005 QW_{23}	—	August 27, 2005	Kitt Peak	Spacewatch	·	1.1 km	MPC · JPL
630278	2005 QV_{48}	—	August 28, 2005	Kitt Peak	Spacewatch	·	1.8 km	MPC · JPL
630279	2005 QZ_{48}	—	August 28, 2005	Kitt Peak	Spacewatch	·	2.2 km	MPC · JPL
630280	2005 QS_{57}	—	August 24, 2005	Palomar	NEAT	·	1.1 km	MPC · JPL
630281	2005 QG_{60}	—	August 28, 2005	Anderson Mesa	LONEOS	·	830 m	MPC · JPL
630282	2005 QE_{64}	—	August 26, 2005	Palomar	NEAT	·	2.0 km	MPC · JPL
630283	2005 QT_{75}	—	December 30, 2007	Kitt Peak	Spacewatch	·	3.6 km	MPC · JPL
630284	2005 QV_{75}	—	August 26, 2005	Palomar	NEAT	EOS	2.1 km	MPC · JPL
630285	2005 QX_{76}	—	July 28, 2005	Palomar	NEAT	V	660 m	MPC · JPL
630286	2005 QD_{90}	—	August 25, 2005	Palomar	NEAT	V	590 m	MPC · JPL
630287	2005 QC_{98}	—	August 31, 2005	Kitt Peak	Spacewatch	·	2.1 km	MPC · JPL
630288	2005 QL_{101}	—	August 31, 2005	Kitt Peak	Spacewatch	·	1.6 km	MPC · JPL
630289	2005 QG_{103}	—	August 31, 2005	Kitt Peak	Spacewatch	·	1.0 km	MPC · JPL
630290	2005 QB_{105}	—	August 31, 2005	Kitt Peak	Spacewatch	·	1.3 km	MPC · JPL
630291	2005 QR_{105}	—	August 28, 2005	Anderson Mesa	LONEOS	·	870 m	MPC · JPL
630292	2005 QW_{106}	—	July 29, 2005	Palomar	NEAT	·	870 m	MPC · JPL
630293	2005 QF_{110}	—	August 31, 2005	Kitt Peak	Spacewatch	(895)	3.8 km	MPC · JPL
630294	2005 QH_{115}	—	August 30, 2005	Kitt Peak	Spacewatch	·	1.0 km	MPC · JPL
630295	2005 QV_{120}	—	November 12, 2001	Apache Point	SDSS Collaboration	·	1.6 km	MPC · JPL
630296	2005 QL_{191}	—	August 27, 2005	Palomar	NEAT	·	2.1 km	MPC · JPL
630297	2005 QJ_{193}	—	August 31, 2005	Kitt Peak	Spacewatch	·	2.9 km	MPC · JPL
630298	2005 QQ_{197}	—	August 31, 2005	Kitt Peak	Spacewatch	·	780 m	MPC · JPL
630299	2005 RX_{15}	—	October 1, 1995	Kitt Peak	Spacewatch	KOR	1.4 km	MPC · JPL
630300	2005 RA_{18}	—	September 1, 2005	Kitt Peak	Spacewatch	·	1.3 km	MPC · JPL

== 630301–630400 ==
back to top

Designation			Discovery			Properties		Ref
Permanent	Provisional	Named after	Date	Site	Discoverer(s)	Category	Diam.	Ref
630301	2005 RJ_{23}	—	July 31, 2005	Palomar	NEAT	·	690 m	MPC · JPL
630302	2005 RB_{26}	—	August 31, 2005	Goodricke-Pigott	R. A. Tucker	·	2.9 km	MPC · JPL
630303	2005 RY_{27}	—	September 11, 2005	Kitt Peak	Spacewatch	·	1.7 km	MPC · JPL
630304	2005 RZ_{38}	—	October 13, 2001	Palomar	NEAT	·	2.4 km	MPC · JPL
630305	2005 RP_{39}	—	December 7, 2002	Kitt Peak	Spacewatch	·	2.0 km	MPC · JPL
630306	2005 RU_{46}	—	September 3, 2005	Apache Point	SDSS Collaboration	·	2.0 km	MPC · JPL
630307	2005 RV_{52}	—	September 14, 2005	Kitt Peak	Spacewatch	MAS	690 m	MPC · JPL
630308	2005 RY_{52}	—	September 14, 2005	Kitt Peak	Spacewatch	·	2.5 km	MPC · JPL
630309	2005 RA_{53}	—	October 18, 2012	Mount Lemmon	Mount Lemmon Survey	·	4.6 km	MPC · JPL
630310	2005 SP_{10}	—	July 29, 2005	Palomar	NEAT	EUN	1.3 km	MPC · JPL
630311	2005 SH_{48}	—	September 24, 2005	Kitt Peak	Spacewatch	·	2.2 km	MPC · JPL
630312	2005 SP_{50}	—	September 24, 2005	Kitt Peak	Spacewatch	·	1.6 km	MPC · JPL
630313	2005 SK_{53}	—	August 29, 2005	Palomar	NEAT	MRX	1.1 km	MPC · JPL
630314	2005 SU_{55}	—	August 30, 2005	Palomar	NEAT	·	830 m	MPC · JPL
630315	2005 SE_{94}	—	September 13, 1998	Kitt Peak	Spacewatch	V	590 m	MPC · JPL
630316	2005 SQ_{155}	—	September 26, 2005	Palomar	NEAT	·	2.1 km	MPC · JPL
630317	2005 SC_{161}	—	September 27, 2005	Kitt Peak	Spacewatch	·	1.3 km	MPC · JPL
630318	2005 SW_{176}	—	September 29, 2005	Kitt Peak	Spacewatch	V	650 m	MPC · JPL
630319	2005 SQ_{178}	—	September 2, 2005	Palomar	NEAT	·	3.9 km	MPC · JPL
630320	2005 SU_{180}	—	September 29, 2005	Anderson Mesa	LONEOS	V	770 m	MPC · JPL
630321	2005 SO_{188}	—	September 29, 2005	Mount Lemmon	Mount Lemmon Survey	·	1.4 km	MPC · JPL
630322	2005 SY_{216}	—	August 30, 2005	Palomar	NEAT	·	2.1 km	MPC · JPL
630323	2005 SD_{224}	—	September 29, 2005	Mount Lemmon	Mount Lemmon Survey	MAS	580 m	MPC · JPL
630324	2005 SH_{241}	—	September 25, 2005	Kitt Peak	Spacewatch	·	1.6 km	MPC · JPL
630325	2005 SP_{253}	—	September 26, 2005	Palomar	NEAT	·	1.7 km	MPC · JPL
630326	2005 SA_{277}	—	September 30, 2005	Anderson Mesa	LONEOS	·	1.8 km	MPC · JPL
630327	2005 SM_{294}	—	September 29, 2005	Mount Lemmon	Mount Lemmon Survey	·	1.6 km	MPC · JPL
630328	2005 SC_{295}	—	September 14, 2014	Haleakala	Pan-STARRS 1	JUN	1.1 km	MPC · JPL
630329	2005 SR_{295}	—	March 26, 2008	Mount Lemmon	Mount Lemmon Survey	·	1.4 km	MPC · JPL
630330	2005 TD_{6}	—	October 1, 2005	Catalina	CSS	·	2.1 km	MPC · JPL
630331	2005 TB_{13}	—	October 2, 2005	Mount Lemmon	Mount Lemmon Survey	·	1.5 km	MPC · JPL
630332	2005 TS_{13}	—	September 2, 2005	Palomar	NEAT	·	2.1 km	MPC · JPL
630333	2005 TR_{17}	—	October 1, 2005	Mount Lemmon	Mount Lemmon Survey	·	1.9 km	MPC · JPL
630334	2005 TG_{20}	—	October 1, 2005	Mount Lemmon	Mount Lemmon Survey	·	1.3 km	MPC · JPL
630335	2005 TJ_{48}	—	September 29, 2005	Kitt Peak	Spacewatch	·	2.4 km	MPC · JPL
630336	2005 TS_{66}	—	October 5, 2005	Mount Lemmon	Mount Lemmon Survey	PAD	1.6 km	MPC · JPL
630337	2005 TS_{68}	—	February 25, 2003	Hoher List	E. W. Elst	AGN	1.5 km	MPC · JPL
630338	2005 TK_{88}	—	September 28, 2005	Palomar	NEAT	·	1.1 km	MPC · JPL
630339	2005 TF_{91}	—	October 6, 2005	Mount Lemmon	Mount Lemmon Survey	(12739)	1.6 km	MPC · JPL
630340	2005 TF_{127}	—	October 7, 2005	Kitt Peak	Spacewatch	HOF	2.3 km	MPC · JPL
630341	2005 TQ_{139}	—	October 8, 2005	Kitt Peak	Spacewatch	·	1.6 km	MPC · JPL
630342	2005 TD_{145}	—	April 25, 2003	Kitt Peak	Spacewatch	·	3.5 km	MPC · JPL
630343	2005 TM_{151}	—	September 29, 2005	Kitt Peak	Spacewatch	·	1.4 km	MPC · JPL
630344	2005 TZ_{153}	—	September 29, 2005	Kitt Peak	Spacewatch	·	1.6 km	MPC · JPL
630345	2005 TJ_{178}	—	October 1, 2005	Catalina	CSS	·	1.4 km	MPC · JPL
630346	2005 TD_{180}	—	October 1, 2005	Mount Lemmon	Mount Lemmon Survey	·	1.3 km	MPC · JPL
630347	2005 TC_{182}	—	October 2, 2005	Mount Lemmon	Mount Lemmon Survey	·	1.6 km	MPC · JPL
630348	2005 TJ_{200}	—	October 3, 2005	Catalina	CSS	ERI	1.3 km	MPC · JPL
630349	2005 TP_{200}	—	December 3, 2010	Mount Lemmon	Mount Lemmon Survey	·	1.4 km	MPC · JPL
630350	2005 TS_{200}	—	February 13, 2008	Mount Lemmon	Mount Lemmon Survey	·	2.6 km	MPC · JPL
630351	2005 TU_{200}	—	October 12, 2005	Kitt Peak	Spacewatch	·	1.2 km	MPC · JPL
630352	2005 TY_{200}	—	October 9, 2005	Kitt Peak	Spacewatch	·	3.1 km	MPC · JPL
630353	2005 TK_{201}	—	October 9, 2012	Mount Lemmon	Mount Lemmon Survey	(2076)	850 m	MPC · JPL
630354	2005 TN_{201}	—	January 17, 2007	Kitt Peak	Spacewatch	MAS	700 m	MPC · JPL
630355	2005 TQ_{202}	—	December 23, 2012	Haleakala	Pan-STARRS 1	·	2.3 km	MPC · JPL
630356	2005 TK_{206}	—	April 20, 2017	Haleakala	Pan-STARRS 1	·	1.5 km	MPC · JPL
630357	2005 TO_{209}	—	October 2, 2005	Mount Lemmon	Mount Lemmon Survey	·	2.4 km	MPC · JPL
630358	2005 TA_{212}	—	September 2, 2014	Haleakala	Pan-STARRS 1	·	1.4 km	MPC · JPL
630359	2005 TW_{221}	—	October 7, 2005	Kitt Peak	Spacewatch	·	890 m	MPC · JPL
630360	2005 TK_{222}	—	October 2, 2005	Mount Lemmon	Mount Lemmon Survey	·	2.0 km	MPC · JPL
630361	2005 UP_{24}	—	October 5, 2005	Kitt Peak	Spacewatch	·	1.4 km	MPC · JPL
630362	2005 UF_{31}	—	April 22, 2004	Kitt Peak	Spacewatch	·	900 m	MPC · JPL
630363	2005 UL_{35}	—	October 24, 2005	Kitt Peak	Spacewatch	·	3.0 km	MPC · JPL
630364	2005 UL_{97}	—	August 1, 2001	Palomar	NEAT	·	1.1 km	MPC · JPL
630365	2005 UY_{117}	—	October 24, 2005	Kitt Peak	Spacewatch	·	1.5 km	MPC · JPL
630366	2005 UB_{126}	—	October 24, 2005	Kitt Peak	Spacewatch	·	1.4 km	MPC · JPL
630367	2005 UM_{138}	—	October 2, 2005	Mount Lemmon	Mount Lemmon Survey	·	1.5 km	MPC · JPL
630368	2005 UY_{157}	—	October 22, 2005	Kitt Peak	Spacewatch	·	1.5 km	MPC · JPL
630369	2005 UN_{172}	—	October 24, 2005	Kitt Peak	Spacewatch	·	1.3 km	MPC · JPL
630370	2005 UK_{188}	—	October 27, 2005	Mount Lemmon	Mount Lemmon Survey	HOF	2.0 km	MPC · JPL
630371	2005 UB_{196}	—	October 24, 2005	Kitt Peak	Spacewatch	·	1.7 km	MPC · JPL
630372	2005 US_{201}	—	October 25, 2005	Kitt Peak	Spacewatch	PAD	1.4 km	MPC · JPL
630373	2005 UF_{204}	—	April 12, 1996	Kitt Peak	Spacewatch	·	1.3 km	MPC · JPL
630374	2005 UH_{209}	—	October 2, 2005	Mount Lemmon	Mount Lemmon Survey	·	3.1 km	MPC · JPL
630375	2005 UR_{209}	—	October 6, 2005	Mount Lemmon	Mount Lemmon Survey	·	1.6 km	MPC · JPL
630376	2005 UV_{228}	—	October 25, 2005	Kitt Peak	Spacewatch	·	1.5 km	MPC · JPL
630377	2005 UN_{233}	—	October 25, 2005	Kitt Peak	Spacewatch	AGN	1.0 km	MPC · JPL
630378	2005 UB_{240}	—	October 25, 2005	Kitt Peak	Spacewatch	·	2.1 km	MPC · JPL
630379	2005 UG_{246}	—	October 27, 2005	Kitt Peak	Spacewatch	WIT	1.0 km	MPC · JPL
630380	2005 US_{255}	—	October 24, 2005	Kitt Peak	Spacewatch	·	3.7 km	MPC · JPL
630381	2005 UQ_{260}	—	October 25, 2005	Kitt Peak	Spacewatch	·	1.5 km	MPC · JPL
630382	2005 UW_{272}	—	October 28, 2005	Kitt Peak	Spacewatch	·	1.7 km	MPC · JPL
630383	2005 UP_{286}	—	October 26, 2005	Kitt Peak	Spacewatch	·	1.2 km	MPC · JPL
630384	2005 UA_{288}	—	October 26, 2005	Kitt Peak	Spacewatch	·	930 m	MPC · JPL
630385	2005 US_{301}	—	October 26, 2005	Kitt Peak	Spacewatch	·	1.7 km	MPC · JPL
630386	2005 UN_{306}	—	October 27, 2005	Mount Lemmon	Mount Lemmon Survey	·	1.5 km	MPC · JPL
630387	2005 UK_{309}	—	October 28, 2005	Mount Lemmon	Mount Lemmon Survey	AGN	1.2 km	MPC · JPL
630388	2005 UT_{316}	—	October 26, 2005	Kitt Peak	Spacewatch	·	1.9 km	MPC · JPL
630389	2005 UH_{318}	—	October 27, 2005	Kitt Peak	Spacewatch	AEO	1.4 km	MPC · JPL
630390	2005 UU_{331}	—	October 5, 2005	Socorro	LINEAR	·	3.7 km	MPC · JPL
630391	2005 UL_{336}	—	October 30, 2005	Kitt Peak	Spacewatch	(12739)	1.4 km	MPC · JPL
630392	2005 UP_{337}	—	October 31, 2005	Kitt Peak	Spacewatch	NYS	1.2 km	MPC · JPL
630393	2005 US_{343}	—	October 29, 2005	Kitt Peak	Spacewatch	·	1.3 km	MPC · JPL
630394	2005 US_{345}	—	October 29, 2005	Catalina	CSS	PAD	1.5 km	MPC · JPL
630395	2005 UH_{355}	—	October 29, 2005	Catalina	CSS	·	870 m	MPC · JPL
630396	2005 UT_{355}	—	October 29, 2005	Mount Lemmon	Mount Lemmon Survey	·	1.5 km	MPC · JPL
630397	2005 UW_{357}	—	October 31, 2005	Mount Lemmon	Mount Lemmon Survey	·	1.7 km	MPC · JPL
630398	2005 UM_{373}	—	October 27, 2005	Kitt Peak	Spacewatch	WIT	810 m	MPC · JPL
630399	2005 UB_{377}	—	October 27, 2005	Kitt Peak	Spacewatch	·	1.0 km	MPC · JPL
630400	2005 UJ_{389}	—	October 29, 2005	Mount Lemmon	Mount Lemmon Survey	·	1.7 km	MPC · JPL

== 630401–630500 ==
back to top

Designation			Discovery			Properties		Ref
Permanent	Provisional	Named after	Date	Site	Discoverer(s)	Category	Diam.	Ref
630401	2005 UR_{407}	—	October 30, 2005	Kitt Peak	Spacewatch	WIT	770 m	MPC · JPL
630402	2005 UD_{411}	—	October 1, 2005	Mount Lemmon	Mount Lemmon Survey	(2076)	720 m	MPC · JPL
630403	2005 UU_{412}	—	October 31, 2005	Mount Lemmon	Mount Lemmon Survey	KOR	1.2 km	MPC · JPL
630404	2005 UM_{420}	—	October 25, 2005	Mount Lemmon	Mount Lemmon Survey	·	1.7 km	MPC · JPL
630405	2005 UY_{431}	—	October 28, 2005	Kitt Peak	Spacewatch	·	1.5 km	MPC · JPL
630406	2005 UH_{436}	—	October 30, 2005	Kitt Peak	Spacewatch	·	1.5 km	MPC · JPL
630407	2005 UZ_{449}	—	March 29, 2008	Kitt Peak	Spacewatch	GEF	910 m	MPC · JPL
630408	2005 UZ_{457}	—	August 21, 2001	Kitt Peak	Spacewatch	·	960 m	MPC · JPL
630409	2005 UV_{463}	—	October 30, 2005	Kitt Peak	Spacewatch	·	1.4 km	MPC · JPL
630410	2005 UV_{473}	—	October 31, 2005	Mount Lemmon	Mount Lemmon Survey	·	1.6 km	MPC · JPL
630411	2005 UB_{480}	—	September 9, 2015	Haleakala	Pan-STARRS 1	·	1.7 km	MPC · JPL
630412	2005 UR_{498}	—	October 22, 2005	Palomar	NEAT	·	1.9 km	MPC · JPL
630413	2005 UQ_{502}	—	October 1, 2005	Anderson Mesa	LONEOS	·	1.0 km	MPC · JPL
630414	2005 UX_{527}	—	April 1, 2008	Kitt Peak	Spacewatch	·	1.9 km	MPC · JPL
630415	2005 US_{533}	—	October 1, 2005	Catalina	CSS	·	1.2 km	MPC · JPL
630416	2005 UP_{535}	—	October 17, 2014	Kitt Peak	Spacewatch	·	1.7 km	MPC · JPL
630417	2005 US_{538}	—	March 12, 2007	Catalina	CSS	·	1.4 km	MPC · JPL
630418	2005 UU_{538}	—	October 22, 2005	Kitt Peak	Spacewatch	·	1.8 km	MPC · JPL
630419	2005 UY_{538}	—	July 2, 2013	Haleakala	Pan-STARRS 1	·	2.2 km	MPC · JPL
630420	2005 UU_{549}	—	October 27, 2005	Kitt Peak	Spacewatch	·	1.5 km	MPC · JPL
630421	2005 UF_{552}	—	October 27, 2005	Mount Lemmon	Mount Lemmon Survey	·	1.6 km	MPC · JPL
630422	2005 VO_{23}	—	October 24, 2005	Kitt Peak	Spacewatch	·	1.5 km	MPC · JPL
630423	2005 VT_{25}	—	November 2, 2005	Mount Lemmon	Mount Lemmon Survey	·	1.7 km	MPC · JPL
630424	2005 VX_{34}	—	November 3, 2005	Mount Lemmon	Mount Lemmon Survey	·	870 m	MPC · JPL
630425	2005 VT_{35}	—	March 4, 2000	Apache Point	SDSS Collaboration	·	850 m	MPC · JPL
630426	2005 VY_{58}	—	November 5, 2005	Kitt Peak	Spacewatch	·	900 m	MPC · JPL
630427	2005 VB_{63}	—	November 4, 2005	Kitt Peak	Spacewatch	·	1.6 km	MPC · JPL
630428	2005 VF_{73}	—	November 6, 2005	Mount Lemmon	Mount Lemmon Survey	HOF	2.2 km	MPC · JPL
630429	2005 VU_{89}	—	October 30, 2005	Mount Lemmon	Mount Lemmon Survey	·	2.1 km	MPC · JPL
630430	2005 VJ_{92}	—	October 29, 2005	Mount Lemmon	Mount Lemmon Survey	·	1.6 km	MPC · JPL
630431	2005 VA_{117}	—	October 30, 2005	Kitt Peak	Spacewatch	·	1.8 km	MPC · JPL
630432	2005 VO_{123}	—	June 23, 2015	Haleakala	Pan-STARRS 1	·	1.0 km	MPC · JPL
630433	2005 VM_{125}	—	September 19, 2014	Haleakala	Pan-STARRS 1	AGN	1.2 km	MPC · JPL
630434	2005 VV_{136}	—	November 4, 2005	Mount Lemmon	Mount Lemmon Survey	·	1.5 km	MPC · JPL
630435	2005 VO_{139}	—	January 28, 2011	Mount Lemmon	Mount Lemmon Survey	·	1.0 km	MPC · JPL
630436	2005 VF_{140}	—	March 15, 2007	Mount Lemmon	Mount Lemmon Survey	HOF	2.3 km	MPC · JPL
630437	2005 VQ_{147}	—	November 12, 2005	Kitt Peak	Spacewatch	·	3.7 km	MPC · JPL
630438	2005 VR_{149}	—	December 14, 2010	Mount Lemmon	Mount Lemmon Survey	·	1.7 km	MPC · JPL
630439	2005 VR_{157}	—	November 10, 2005	Kitt Peak	Spacewatch	·	1.6 km	MPC · JPL
630440	2005 WM_{16}	—	November 22, 2005	Kitt Peak	Spacewatch	·	1.9 km	MPC · JPL
630441	2005 WW_{28}	—	November 21, 2005	Kitt Peak	Spacewatch	AGN	970 m	MPC · JPL
630442	2005 WX_{75}	—	October 25, 2000	Kitt Peak	Spacewatch	·	1.8 km	MPC · JPL
630443	2005 WY_{94}	—	November 26, 2005	Kitt Peak	Spacewatch	HOF	2.3 km	MPC · JPL
630444	2005 WT_{95}	—	November 26, 2005	Kitt Peak	Spacewatch	·	1.7 km	MPC · JPL
630445	2005 WE_{103}	—	March 24, 2003	Kitt Peak	Spacewatch	·	1.2 km	MPC · JPL
630446	2005 WF_{107}	—	October 25, 2005	Mount Lemmon	Mount Lemmon Survey	MAS	790 m	MPC · JPL
630447	2005 WH_{109}	—	August 3, 2004	Siding Spring	SSS	·	1.4 km	MPC · JPL
630448	2005 WV_{123}	—	October 25, 2005	Mount Lemmon	Mount Lemmon Survey	KOR	1.3 km	MPC · JPL
630449	2005 WB_{126}	—	October 26, 2005	Kitt Peak	Spacewatch	·	1.4 km	MPC · JPL
630450	2005 WW_{135}	—	November 26, 2005	Kitt Peak	Spacewatch	·	1.7 km	MPC · JPL
630451	2005 WU_{145}	—	November 25, 2005	Kitt Peak	Spacewatch	·	1.6 km	MPC · JPL
630452	2005 WA_{149}	—	November 28, 2005	Kitt Peak	Spacewatch	EUN	1.4 km	MPC · JPL
630453	2005 WF_{159}	—	November 29, 2005	Catalina	CSS	·	2.6 km	MPC · JPL
630454	2005 WK_{175}	—	November 30, 2005	Kitt Peak	Spacewatch	V	680 m	MPC · JPL
630455	2005 WM_{175}	—	November 30, 2005	Kitt Peak	Spacewatch	·	1.6 km	MPC · JPL
630456	2005 WC_{192}	—	November 28, 1994	Kitt Peak	Spacewatch	·	1.2 km	MPC · JPL
630457	2005 WD_{199}	—	November 25, 2005	Kitt Peak	Spacewatch	·	1.1 km	MPC · JPL
630458	2005 WA_{213}	—	November 21, 2005	Kitt Peak	Spacewatch	EUN	1.5 km	MPC · JPL
630459	2005 WR_{213}	—	September 20, 2008	Catalina	CSS	·	1.2 km	MPC · JPL
630460	2005 WO_{218}	—	November 26, 2005	Mount Lemmon	Mount Lemmon Survey	·	1.5 km	MPC · JPL
630461	2005 WG_{220}	—	November 21, 2005	Kitt Peak	Spacewatch	·	2.6 km	MPC · JPL
630462	2005 XO_{20}	—	December 2, 2005	Kitt Peak	Spacewatch	AGN	990 m	MPC · JPL
630463	2005 XU_{20}	—	December 2, 2005	Kitt Peak	Spacewatch	·	1.6 km	MPC · JPL
630464	2005 XU_{25}	—	December 4, 2005	Mount Lemmon	Mount Lemmon Survey	HOF	2.0 km	MPC · JPL
630465	2005 XP_{31}	—	December 1, 2005	Kitt Peak	Spacewatch	·	1.1 km	MPC · JPL
630466	2005 XR_{33}	—	March 5, 2002	Apache Point	SDSS Collaboration	·	1.9 km	MPC · JPL
630467	2005 XJ_{42}	—	December 4, 2005	Kitt Peak	Spacewatch	·	2.1 km	MPC · JPL
630468	2005 XO_{44}	—	December 2, 2005	Kitt Peak	Spacewatch	·	1.7 km	MPC · JPL
630469	2005 XW_{56}	—	December 1, 2005	Kitt Peak	Spacewatch	·	930 m	MPC · JPL
630470	2005 XV_{66}	—	August 23, 2004	Kitt Peak	Spacewatch	AGN	1.0 km	MPC · JPL
630471	2005 XG_{77}	—	December 8, 2005	Kitt Peak	Spacewatch	·	3.8 km	MPC · JPL
630472	2005 XS_{81}	—	December 7, 2005	Kitt Peak	Spacewatch	·	990 m	MPC · JPL
630473	2005 XS_{82}	—	December 10, 2005	Kitt Peak	Spacewatch	·	1.4 km	MPC · JPL
630474	2005 XJ_{89}	—	December 7, 2005	Kitt Peak	Spacewatch	·	2.2 km	MPC · JPL
630475	2005 XH_{102}	—	August 25, 2003	Cerro Tololo	Deep Ecliptic Survey	·	2.3 km	MPC · JPL
630476	2005 XE_{107}	—	September 13, 1998	Kitt Peak	Spacewatch	·	1.8 km	MPC · JPL
630477	2005 XC_{108}	—	July 21, 2004	Siding Spring	SSS	·	1.1 km	MPC · JPL
630478	2005 XT_{115}	—	December 4, 2005	Mount Lemmon	Mount Lemmon Survey	·	1.5 km	MPC · JPL
630479	2005 XJ_{120}	—	December 25, 2010	Kitt Peak	Spacewatch	·	2.2 km	MPC · JPL
630480	2005 XY_{120}	—	December 1, 2005	Kitt Peak	Spacewatch	·	2.0 km	MPC · JPL
630481	2005 XE_{125}	—	September 15, 2009	Kitt Peak	Spacewatch	·	2.0 km	MPC · JPL
630482	2005 XW_{125}	—	January 14, 2018	Mount Lemmon	Mount Lemmon Survey	PHO	770 m	MPC · JPL
630483	2005 XX_{125}	—	January 8, 2011	Mount Lemmon	Mount Lemmon Survey	·	1.4 km	MPC · JPL
630484	2005 XM_{130}	—	January 26, 2011	Mount Lemmon	Mount Lemmon Survey	·	1.3 km	MPC · JPL
630485	2005 XG_{132}	—	December 1, 2005	Kitt Peak	Spacewatch	·	1.5 km	MPC · JPL
630486	2005 YZ_{6}	—	December 21, 2005	Junk Bond	D. Healy	·	2.1 km	MPC · JPL
630487	2005 YG_{26}	—	December 24, 2005	Kitt Peak	Spacewatch	NYS	890 m	MPC · JPL
630488	2005 YL_{42}	—	December 3, 2005	Kitt Peak	Spacewatch	·	2.0 km	MPC · JPL
630489	2005 YH_{45}	—	December 25, 2005	Kitt Peak	Spacewatch	KOR	1.2 km	MPC · JPL
630490	2005 YC_{66}	—	December 25, 2005	Kitt Peak	Spacewatch	·	1.6 km	MPC · JPL
630491	2005 YC_{75}	—	December 24, 2005	Kitt Peak	Spacewatch	·	1.5 km	MPC · JPL
630492	2005 YM_{81}	—	December 24, 2005	Kitt Peak	Spacewatch	·	1.5 km	MPC · JPL
630493	2005 YE_{101}	—	December 25, 2005	Kitt Peak	Spacewatch	DOR	1.7 km	MPC · JPL
630494	2005 YH_{101}	—	December 25, 2005	Kitt Peak	Spacewatch	·	910 m	MPC · JPL
630495	2005 YF_{103}	—	December 5, 2005	Kitt Peak	Spacewatch	·	3.4 km	MPC · JPL
630496	2005 YY_{107}	—	December 25, 2005	Kitt Peak	Spacewatch	·	1.7 km	MPC · JPL
630497	2005 YS_{120}	—	December 27, 2005	Mount Lemmon	Mount Lemmon Survey	·	4.3 km	MPC · JPL
630498	2005 YG_{126}	—	December 26, 2005	Kitt Peak	Spacewatch	·	1.9 km	MPC · JPL
630499	2005 YU_{135}	—	November 25, 2005	Mount Lemmon	Mount Lemmon Survey	·	2.1 km	MPC · JPL
630500	2005 YO_{140}	—	December 28, 2005	Mount Lemmon	Mount Lemmon Survey	·	1.0 km	MPC · JPL

== 630501–630600 ==
back to top

Designation			Discovery			Properties		Ref
Permanent	Provisional	Named after	Date	Site	Discoverer(s)	Category	Diam.	Ref
630501	2005 YT_{140}	—	December 28, 2005	Mount Lemmon	Mount Lemmon Survey	BRA	1.7 km	MPC · JPL
630502	2005 YR_{146}	—	December 29, 2005	Mount Lemmon	Mount Lemmon Survey	·	1.9 km	MPC · JPL
630503	2005 YS_{157}	—	December 27, 2005	Kitt Peak	Spacewatch	HOF	2.3 km	MPC · JPL
630504	2005 YO_{163}	—	March 27, 2003	Kitt Peak	Spacewatch	·	1.3 km	MPC · JPL
630505	2005 YB_{183}	—	December 27, 2005	Kitt Peak	Spacewatch	·	1.6 km	MPC · JPL
630506	2005 YJ_{194}	—	December 31, 2005	Kitt Peak	Spacewatch	·	1.5 km	MPC · JPL
630507	2005 YZ_{196}	—	September 9, 2004	Kitt Peak	Spacewatch	·	1.4 km	MPC · JPL
630508	2005 YU_{199}	—	November 5, 2005	Kitt Peak	Spacewatch	KOR	1.3 km	MPC · JPL
630509	2005 YQ_{200}	—	December 22, 2005	Kitt Peak	Spacewatch	·	2.1 km	MPC · JPL
630510	2005 YK_{216}	—	December 4, 2005	Kitt Peak	Spacewatch	·	2.1 km	MPC · JPL
630511	2005 YL_{216}	—	December 29, 2005	Mount Lemmon	Mount Lemmon Survey	·	1.5 km	MPC · JPL
630512	2005 YR_{216}	—	November 10, 2005	Mount Lemmon	Mount Lemmon Survey	HOF	2.7 km	MPC · JPL
630513	2005 YG_{218}	—	December 30, 2005	Kitt Peak	Spacewatch	·	1.9 km	MPC · JPL
630514	2005 YZ_{223}	—	December 24, 2005	Kitt Peak	Spacewatch	·	1.8 km	MPC · JPL
630515	2005 YC_{224}	—	December 24, 2005	Kitt Peak	Spacewatch	·	2.1 km	MPC · JPL
630516	2005 YO_{224}	—	December 8, 2005	Kitt Peak	Spacewatch	·	2.1 km	MPC · JPL
630517	2005 YK_{227}	—	December 25, 2005	Kitt Peak	Spacewatch	·	1.7 km	MPC · JPL
630518	2005 YA_{229}	—	December 25, 2005	Kitt Peak	Spacewatch	·	2.0 km	MPC · JPL
630519	2005 YS_{230}	—	December 26, 2005	Mount Lemmon	Mount Lemmon Survey	·	1.8 km	MPC · JPL
630520	2005 YK_{242}	—	December 30, 2005	Kitt Peak	Spacewatch	·	1.9 km	MPC · JPL
630521	2005 YU_{245}	—	December 30, 2005	Kitt Peak	Spacewatch	·	1.2 km	MPC · JPL
630522	2005 YY_{249}	—	December 2, 2005	Mount Lemmon	Mount Lemmon Survey	AST	1.4 km	MPC · JPL
630523	2005 YE_{259}	—	December 24, 2005	Kitt Peak	Spacewatch	·	880 m	MPC · JPL
630524	2005 YY_{260}	—	December 24, 2005	Kitt Peak	Spacewatch	·	800 m	MPC · JPL
630525	2005 YO_{268}	—	December 25, 2005	Kitt Peak	Spacewatch	AGN	1.3 km	MPC · JPL
630526	2005 YK_{271}	—	December 28, 2005	Kitt Peak	Spacewatch	V	630 m	MPC · JPL
630527	2005 YR_{272}	—	December 30, 2005	Kitt Peak	Spacewatch	KOR	1.2 km	MPC · JPL
630528	2005 YR_{277}	—	December 25, 2005	Kitt Peak	Spacewatch	HOF	2.4 km	MPC · JPL
630529	2005 YU_{282}	—	November 25, 2005	Kitt Peak	Spacewatch	·	1.5 km	MPC · JPL
630530	2005 YY_{291}	—	December 28, 2005	Mount Lemmon	Mount Lemmon Survey	·	1.9 km	MPC · JPL
630531	2005 YR_{294}	—	October 26, 2011	Haleakala	Pan-STARRS 1	·	3.5 km	MPC · JPL
630532	2005 YX_{294}	—	November 16, 2017	Mount Lemmon	Mount Lemmon Survey	·	3.9 km	MPC · JPL
630533	2006 AZ_{1}	—	January 2, 2006	Mount Lemmon	Mount Lemmon Survey	·	700 m	MPC · JPL
630534	2006 AF_{9}	—	January 4, 2006	Kitt Peak	Spacewatch	·	1.8 km	MPC · JPL
630535	2006 AS_{12}	—	January 4, 2006	Mount Lemmon	Mount Lemmon Survey	·	1.6 km	MPC · JPL
630536	2006 AP_{16}	—	December 27, 2005	Kitt Peak	Spacewatch	·	3.6 km	MPC · JPL
630537	2006 AM_{19}	—	January 4, 2006	Mount Lemmon	Mount Lemmon Survey	·	1.8 km	MPC · JPL
630538	2006 AX_{22}	—	January 4, 2006	Kitt Peak	Spacewatch	·	1.9 km	MPC · JPL
630539	2006 AJ_{30}	—	January 2, 2006	Mount Lemmon	Mount Lemmon Survey	·	1.2 km	MPC · JPL
630540	2006 AP_{31}	—	December 30, 2005	Kitt Peak	Spacewatch	·	2.8 km	MPC · JPL
630541	2006 AE_{45}	—	January 6, 2006	Catalina	CSS	PHO	1.1 km	MPC · JPL
630542	2006 AV_{46}	—	December 1, 2005	Mount Lemmon	Mount Lemmon Survey	AEO	1.0 km	MPC · JPL
630543	2006 AT_{51}	—	January 5, 2006	Kitt Peak	Spacewatch	·	1.5 km	MPC · JPL
630544	2006 AC_{60}	—	December 25, 2005	Mount Lemmon	Mount Lemmon Survey	AGN	950 m	MPC · JPL
630545	2006 AT_{60}	—	January 5, 2006	Kitt Peak	Spacewatch	·	1.9 km	MPC · JPL
630546	2006 AD_{77}	—	December 25, 2005	Kitt Peak	Spacewatch	·	2.0 km	MPC · JPL
630547	2006 AF_{88}	—	January 5, 2006	Kitt Peak	Spacewatch	AGN	980 m	MPC · JPL
630548	2006 AH_{93}	—	January 7, 2006	Kitt Peak	Spacewatch	·	1.7 km	MPC · JPL
630549	2006 AG_{105}	—	October 28, 2005	Mount Lemmon	Mount Lemmon Survey	·	2.1 km	MPC · JPL
630550	2006 AP_{107}	—	November 30, 2005	Kitt Peak	Spacewatch	·	1.8 km	MPC · JPL
630551	2006 AD_{109}	—	February 13, 2011	Mount Lemmon	Mount Lemmon Survey	·	1.6 km	MPC · JPL
630552	2006 AY_{110}	—	January 30, 2011	Mount Lemmon	Mount Lemmon Survey	·	1.8 km	MPC · JPL
630553	2006 AT_{113}	—	January 7, 2006	Kitt Peak	Spacewatch	·	1.3 km	MPC · JPL
630554	2006 BO_{3}	—	January 21, 2006	Kitt Peak	Spacewatch	NYS	1.3 km	MPC · JPL
630555	2006 BZ_{4}	—	January 21, 2006	Kitt Peak	Spacewatch	·	2.0 km	MPC · JPL
630556	2006 BB_{7}	—	December 5, 2005	Mount Lemmon	Mount Lemmon Survey	·	1.2 km	MPC · JPL
630557	2006 BZ_{11}	—	January 21, 2006	Kitt Peak	Spacewatch	·	2.0 km	MPC · JPL
630558	2006 BP_{14}	—	January 22, 2006	Mount Lemmon	Mount Lemmon Survey	KOR	1.2 km	MPC · JPL
630559	2006 BY_{14}	—	January 22, 2006	Mount Lemmon	Mount Lemmon Survey	·	1.4 km	MPC · JPL
630560	2006 BX_{28}	—	January 7, 2006	Kitt Peak	Spacewatch	(16286)	1.6 km	MPC · JPL
630561	2006 BA_{30}	—	January 18, 2006	Catalina	CSS	·	1.4 km	MPC · JPL
630562	2006 BS_{37}	—	January 23, 2006	Mount Lemmon	Mount Lemmon Survey	AST	1.6 km	MPC · JPL
630563	2006 BE_{49}	—	January 7, 2006	Kitt Peak	Spacewatch	KOR	1.1 km	MPC · JPL
630564	2006 BZ_{70}	—	January 23, 2006	Kitt Peak	Spacewatch	HOF	2.6 km	MPC · JPL
630565	2006 BR_{74}	—	December 14, 1995	Kitt Peak	Spacewatch	·	2.0 km	MPC · JPL
630566	2006 BX_{102}	—	January 23, 2006	Mount Lemmon	Mount Lemmon Survey	·	1.6 km	MPC · JPL
630567	2006 BN_{125}	—	January 26, 2006	Kitt Peak	Spacewatch	KOR	1.3 km	MPC · JPL
630568	2006 BD_{129}	—	March 31, 2003	Kitt Peak	Spacewatch	V	690 m	MPC · JPL
630569	2006 BN_{140}	—	January 22, 2006	Mount Lemmon	Mount Lemmon Survey	·	1.9 km	MPC · JPL
630570	2006 BJ_{141}	—	January 25, 2006	Kitt Peak	Spacewatch	·	2.6 km	MPC · JPL
630571	2006 BK_{156}	—	January 25, 2006	Kitt Peak	Spacewatch	KOR	1.5 km	MPC · JPL
630572	2006 BL_{162}	—	October 7, 2005	Mauna Kea	A. Boattini	KOR	1.4 km	MPC · JPL
630573	2006 BB_{183}	—	January 27, 2006	Mount Lemmon	Mount Lemmon Survey	·	1.9 km	MPC · JPL
630574	2006 BG_{185}	—	January 28, 2006	Mount Lemmon	Mount Lemmon Survey	·	1.8 km	MPC · JPL
630575	2006 BZ_{196}	—	January 30, 2006	Kitt Peak	Spacewatch	·	2.7 km	MPC · JPL
630576	2006 BB_{205}	—	January 31, 2006	Kitt Peak	Spacewatch	KOR	1.5 km	MPC · JPL
630577	2006 BY_{211}	—	January 7, 2006	Mount Lemmon	Mount Lemmon Survey	·	2.3 km	MPC · JPL
630578	2006 BW_{215}	—	January 25, 2006	Catalina	CSS	DOR	2.6 km	MPC · JPL
630579	2006 BM_{226}	—	January 30, 2006	Kitt Peak	Spacewatch	·	1.5 km	MPC · JPL
630580	2006 BA_{234}	—	January 31, 2006	Kitt Peak	Spacewatch	KOR	1.3 km	MPC · JPL
630581	2006 BQ_{234}	—	January 10, 2006	Mount Lemmon	Mount Lemmon Survey	VER	2.4 km	MPC · JPL
630582	2006 BP_{236}	—	January 23, 2006	Kitt Peak	Spacewatch	·	650 m	MPC · JPL
630583	2006 BO_{241}	—	October 24, 2005	Mauna Kea	A. Boattini	·	3.0 km	MPC · JPL
630584	2006 BO_{248}	—	January 31, 2006	Kitt Peak	Spacewatch	L5	9.0 km	MPC · JPL
630585	2006 BB_{251}	—	January 31, 2006	Mount Lemmon	Mount Lemmon Survey	·	1.9 km	MPC · JPL
630586	2006 BE_{253}	—	January 31, 2006	Kitt Peak	Spacewatch	·	1.3 km	MPC · JPL
630587	2006 BY_{253}	—	November 7, 2005	Mauna Kea	A. Boattini	KOR	1.2 km	MPC · JPL
630588	2006 BU_{262}	—	January 31, 2006	Kitt Peak	Spacewatch	THM	2.5 km	MPC · JPL
630589	2006 BF_{280}	—	January 26, 2006	Mount Lemmon	Mount Lemmon Survey	·	1.5 km	MPC · JPL
630590	2006 BX_{286}	—	January 30, 2006	Kitt Peak	Spacewatch	·	720 m	MPC · JPL
630591	2006 BY_{286}	—	November 22, 2009	Mount Lemmon	Mount Lemmon Survey	·	2.3 km	MPC · JPL
630592	2006 BJ_{295}	—	April 13, 2018	Haleakala	Pan-STARRS 1	SUL	1.8 km	MPC · JPL
630593	2006 BA_{297}	—	January 30, 2006	Kitt Peak	Spacewatch	L5	7.1 km	MPC · JPL
630594	2006 BC_{297}	—	January 26, 2006	Kitt Peak	Spacewatch	L5	7.9 km	MPC · JPL
630595	2006 BN_{297}	—	January 26, 2006	Mount Lemmon	Mount Lemmon Survey	L5	8.6 km	MPC · JPL
630596	2006 CD_{5}	—	March 4, 2002	Cima Ekar	ADAS	·	900 m	MPC · JPL
630597	2006 CY_{11}	—	February 1, 2006	Kitt Peak	Spacewatch	·	1.9 km	MPC · JPL
630598	2006 CY_{23}	—	February 2, 2006	Kitt Peak	Spacewatch	KOR	1.2 km	MPC · JPL
630599	2006 CJ_{28}	—	February 2, 2006	Kitt Peak	Spacewatch	KOR	1.2 km	MPC · JPL
630600	2006 CW_{31}	—	February 2, 2006	Kitt Peak	Spacewatch	·	2.2 km	MPC · JPL

== 630601–630700 ==
back to top

Designation			Discovery			Properties		Ref
Permanent	Provisional	Named after	Date	Site	Discoverer(s)	Category	Diam.	Ref
630601	2006 CE_{53}	—	February 4, 2006	Kitt Peak	Spacewatch	·	1.9 km	MPC · JPL
630602	2006 CL_{53}	—	December 24, 2005	Kitt Peak	Spacewatch	·	2.2 km	MPC · JPL
630603	2006 CJ_{66}	—	December 5, 2005	Mount Lemmon	Mount Lemmon Survey	(13314)	1.7 km	MPC · JPL
630604	2006 CO_{79}	—	November 22, 2009	Kitt Peak	Spacewatch	KOR	1.1 km	MPC · JPL
630605	2006 CV_{81}	—	February 1, 2006	Kitt Peak	Spacewatch	·	570 m	MPC · JPL
630606	2006 CU_{86}	—	October 7, 2005	Mauna Kea	A. Boattini	·	1.1 km	MPC · JPL
630607	2006 CB_{87}	—	November 27, 2014	Haleakala	Pan-STARRS 1	L5	6.8 km	MPC · JPL
630608	2006 DN_{5}	—	January 28, 2006	Mount Lemmon	Mount Lemmon Survey	NYS	1.1 km	MPC · JPL
630609	2006 DC_{18}	—	February 20, 2006	Kitt Peak	Spacewatch	·	1.5 km	MPC · JPL
630610	2006 DF_{20}	—	July 8, 2003	Palomar	NEAT	·	2.4 km	MPC · JPL
630611	2006 DX_{53}	—	January 30, 2006	Kitt Peak	Spacewatch	KOR	1.3 km	MPC · JPL
630612	2006 DS_{56}	—	January 23, 2006	Kitt Peak	Spacewatch	·	1.8 km	MPC · JPL
630613	2006 DW_{58}	—	September 18, 2003	Kitt Peak	Spacewatch	·	1.9 km	MPC · JPL
630614	2006 DP_{72}	—	March 20, 2002	Kitt Peak	Spacewatch	·	1.1 km	MPC · JPL
630615	2006 DV_{80}	—	February 24, 2006	Kitt Peak	Spacewatch	NYS	970 m	MPC · JPL
630616	2006 DM_{85}	—	February 24, 2006	Mount Lemmon	Mount Lemmon Survey	PHO	1.3 km	MPC · JPL
630617	2006 DF_{99}	—	February 20, 2006	Kitt Peak	Spacewatch	KOR	1.4 km	MPC · JPL
630618	2006 DR_{105}	—	February 25, 2006	Mount Lemmon	Mount Lemmon Survey	·	1.8 km	MPC · JPL
630619	2006 DM_{106}	—	February 25, 2006	Mount Lemmon	Mount Lemmon Survey	BRA	1.3 km	MPC · JPL
630620	2006 DN_{123}	—	February 24, 2006	Kitt Peak	Spacewatch	(12739)	1.9 km	MPC · JPL
630621	2006 DT_{129}	—	February 25, 2006	Kitt Peak	Spacewatch	·	870 m	MPC · JPL
630622	2006 DW_{138}	—	February 25, 2006	Kitt Peak	Spacewatch	·	1.4 km	MPC · JPL
630623	2006 DT_{139}	—	February 25, 2006	Kitt Peak	Spacewatch	·	1.9 km	MPC · JPL
630624	2006 DM_{144}	—	August 7, 2008	Kitt Peak	Spacewatch	KOR	1.3 km	MPC · JPL
630625	2006 DF_{146}	—	February 25, 2006	Mount Lemmon	Mount Lemmon Survey	·	2.3 km	MPC · JPL
630626	2006 DV_{148}	—	February 25, 2006	Kitt Peak	Spacewatch	KOR	1.5 km	MPC · JPL
630627	2006 DA_{151}	—	February 25, 2006	Kitt Peak	Spacewatch	·	1.2 km	MPC · JPL
630628	2006 DC_{159}	—	November 20, 2004	Kitt Peak	Spacewatch	KOR	1.5 km	MPC · JPL
630629	2006 DJ_{164}	—	October 18, 2003	Kitt Peak	Spacewatch	KOR	1.5 km	MPC · JPL
630630	2006 DS_{165}	—	February 27, 2006	Kitt Peak	Spacewatch	MAS	630 m	MPC · JPL
630631	2006 DF_{173}	—	February 27, 2006	Kitt Peak	Spacewatch	·	1.2 km	MPC · JPL
630632	2006 DN_{173}	—	February 27, 2006	Kitt Peak	Spacewatch	MAS	740 m	MPC · JPL
630633	2006 DB_{174}	—	February 27, 2006	Kitt Peak	Spacewatch	·	1.8 km	MPC · JPL
630634	2006 DR_{180}	—	September 22, 2003	Kitt Peak	Spacewatch	KOR	1.3 km	MPC · JPL
630635	2006 DV_{188}	—	August 20, 2003	Campo Imperatore	CINEOS	·	2.5 km	MPC · JPL
630636	2006 DY_{188}	—	February 27, 2006	Kitt Peak	Spacewatch	·	550 m	MPC · JPL
630637	2006 DE_{195}	—	October 24, 2005	Mauna Kea	A. Boattini	GEF	1.6 km	MPC · JPL
630638	2006 DW_{222}	—	September 9, 2015	Haleakala	Pan-STARRS 1	·	2.8 km	MPC · JPL
630639	2006 EJ_{3}	—	March 2, 2006	Kitt Peak	Spacewatch	·	1.5 km	MPC · JPL
630640	2006 EY_{5}	—	January 30, 2006	Kitt Peak	Spacewatch	NYS	960 m	MPC · JPL
630641	2006 EJ_{6}	—	December 1, 1994	Kitt Peak	Spacewatch	·	1.9 km	MPC · JPL
630642	2006 ES_{25}	—	September 16, 2003	Kitt Peak	Spacewatch	KOR	1.5 km	MPC · JPL
630643	2006 EM_{43}	—	March 5, 2006	Mount Lemmon	Mount Lemmon Survey	·	2.4 km	MPC · JPL
630644	2006 EB_{44}	—	March 5, 2006	Mount Lemmon	Mount Lemmon Survey	NYS	980 m	MPC · JPL
630645	2006 EU_{46}	—	November 30, 1999	Kitt Peak	Spacewatch	·	2.5 km	MPC · JPL
630646	2006 EL_{47}	—	March 4, 2006	Kitt Peak	Spacewatch	NYS	1.2 km	MPC · JPL
630647	2006 EV_{57}	—	March 5, 2006	Kitt Peak	Spacewatch	·	1.8 km	MPC · JPL
630648	2006 EP_{69}	—	March 3, 2006	Kitt Peak	Spacewatch	·	4.3 km	MPC · JPL
630649	2006 EO_{75}	—	July 8, 2003	Palomar	NEAT	·	2.1 km	MPC · JPL
630650	2006 EO_{76}	—	March 4, 2011	Mount Lemmon	Mount Lemmon Survey	KOR	1.3 km	MPC · JPL
630651	2006 EW_{76}	—	March 4, 2006	Mount Lemmon	Mount Lemmon Survey	·	620 m	MPC · JPL
630652	2006 ET_{78}	—	July 30, 2008	Mount Lemmon	Mount Lemmon Survey	KOR	1.1 km	MPC · JPL
630653	2006 EF_{81}	—	November 18, 2009	Kitt Peak	Spacewatch	·	1.9 km	MPC · JPL
630654	2006 FL_{5}	—	September 16, 2003	Kitt Peak	Spacewatch	KOR	1.4 km	MPC · JPL
630655	2006 FW_{7}	—	March 23, 2006	Kitt Peak	Spacewatch	·	1.3 km	MPC · JPL
630656	2006 FT_{22}	—	March 24, 2006	Mount Lemmon	Mount Lemmon Survey	·	880 m	MPC · JPL
630657	2006 FD_{26}	—	March 24, 2006	Mount Lemmon	Mount Lemmon Survey	EOS	1.9 km	MPC · JPL
630658	2006 FY_{27}	—	March 24, 2006	Mount Lemmon	Mount Lemmon Survey	·	1.7 km	MPC · JPL
630659	2006 FG_{32}	—	February 22, 2006	Mount Lemmon	Mount Lemmon Survey	·	1.6 km	MPC · JPL
630660	2006 FR_{38}	—	March 4, 2006	Mount Lemmon	Mount Lemmon Survey	(5)	1.5 km	MPC · JPL
630661	2006 FJ_{58}	—	March 23, 2006	Kitt Peak	Spacewatch	·	1.7 km	MPC · JPL
630662	2006 FO_{58}	—	February 10, 1996	Kitt Peak	Spacewatch	·	1.4 km	MPC · JPL
630663	2006 FP_{58}	—	March 23, 2006	Kitt Peak	Spacewatch	·	1.0 km	MPC · JPL
630664	2006 GH_{11}	—	April 2, 2006	Kitt Peak	Spacewatch	·	1.7 km	MPC · JPL
630665	2006 GN_{11}	—	April 2, 2006	Kitt Peak	Spacewatch	·	2.0 km	MPC · JPL
630666	2006 GK_{16}	—	April 2, 2006	Kitt Peak	Spacewatch	·	1.8 km	MPC · JPL
630667	2006 GM_{19}	—	April 2, 2006	Kitt Peak	Spacewatch	KOR	1.3 km	MPC · JPL
630668	2006 GX_{43}	—	April 2, 2006	Kitt Peak	Spacewatch	·	940 m	MPC · JPL
630669	2006 GX_{55}	—	October 16, 2007	Mount Lemmon	Mount Lemmon Survey	·	730 m	MPC · JPL
630670	2006 HS_{15}	—	December 2, 2005	Kitt Peak	Wasserman, L. H., Millis, R. L.	NYS	1.2 km	MPC · JPL
630671	2006 HK_{16}	—	April 20, 2006	Kitt Peak	Spacewatch	·	1.3 km	MPC · JPL
630672	2006 HD_{20}	—	April 19, 2006	Mount Lemmon	Mount Lemmon Survey	EOS	1.9 km	MPC · JPL
630673	2006 HY_{58}	—	March 24, 2006	Catalina	CSS	·	3.9 km	MPC · JPL
630674	2006 HJ_{59}	—	April 21, 2006	Siding Spring	SSS	EOS	2.7 km	MPC · JPL
630675	2006 HM_{75}	—	April 25, 2006	Kitt Peak	Spacewatch	·	1.2 km	MPC · JPL
630676	2006 HB_{77}	—	April 25, 2006	Kitt Peak	Spacewatch	EOS	1.6 km	MPC · JPL
630677	2006 HT_{98}	—	April 30, 2006	Kitt Peak	Spacewatch	·	2.1 km	MPC · JPL
630678	2006 HF_{100}	—	September 21, 2003	Kitt Peak	Spacewatch	(5)	1.3 km	MPC · JPL
630679	2006 HN_{106}	—	April 30, 2006	Kitt Peak	Spacewatch	·	2.5 km	MPC · JPL
630680	2006 HV_{107}	—	September 3, 2000	Kitt Peak	Spacewatch	·	650 m	MPC · JPL
630681	2006 HD_{118}	—	March 5, 2006	Kitt Peak	Spacewatch	TIR	2.8 km	MPC · JPL
630682	2006 HY_{149}	—	October 8, 2002	Kitt Peak	Spacewatch	·	2.1 km	MPC · JPL
630683	2006 HM_{155}	—	September 23, 2008	Kitt Peak	Spacewatch	EOS	1.7 km	MPC · JPL
630684	2006 HQ_{157}	—	September 18, 2014	Haleakala	Pan-STARRS 1	·	2.4 km	MPC · JPL
630685	2006 JK_{6}	—	May 2, 2006	Mount Lemmon	Mount Lemmon Survey	·	1.0 km	MPC · JPL
630686	2006 JV_{8}	—	May 1, 2006	Kitt Peak	Spacewatch	·	2.1 km	MPC · JPL
630687	2006 JZ_{15}	—	May 2, 2006	Mount Lemmon	Mount Lemmon Survey	NYS	950 m	MPC · JPL
630688	2006 JF_{18}	—	May 2, 2006	Mount Lemmon	Mount Lemmon Survey	·	2.9 km	MPC · JPL
630689	2006 JC_{38}	—	May 5, 2006	Mount Lemmon	Mount Lemmon Survey	·	1.7 km	MPC · JPL
630690	2006 JP_{51}	—	May 3, 2006	Kitt Peak	Spacewatch	·	2.1 km	MPC · JPL
630691	2006 JN_{52}	—	October 29, 2003	Kitt Peak	Spacewatch	EOS	2.6 km	MPC · JPL
630692	2006 JA_{57}	—	May 10, 2006	Palomar	NEAT	·	3.2 km	MPC · JPL
630693	2006 JH_{61}	—	March 25, 2006	Kitt Peak	Spacewatch	·	1.7 km	MPC · JPL
630694	2006 JQ_{67}	—	December 20, 2004	Mount Lemmon	Mount Lemmon Survey	THM	2.3 km	MPC · JPL
630695	2006 JU_{76}	—	May 3, 2006	Mount Lemmon	Mount Lemmon Survey	·	2.0 km	MPC · JPL
630696	2006 JE_{84}	—	January 16, 2015	Haleakala	Pan-STARRS 1	EOS	1.5 km	MPC · JPL
630697	2006 JU_{84}	—	May 4, 2006	Siding Spring	SSS	·	1.7 km	MPC · JPL
630698	2006 JE_{85}	—	October 11, 2007	Kitt Peak	Spacewatch	·	550 m	MPC · JPL
630699	2006 JG_{85}	—	May 7, 2006	Mount Lemmon	Mount Lemmon Survey	·	1.1 km	MPC · JPL
630700	2006 JY_{85}	—	November 1, 2008	Mount Lemmon	Mount Lemmon Survey	·	1.7 km	MPC · JPL

== 630701–630800 ==
back to top

Designation			Discovery			Properties		Ref
Permanent	Provisional	Named after	Date	Site	Discoverer(s)	Category	Diam.	Ref
630701	2006 JL_{88}	—	May 1, 2006	Kitt Peak	Spacewatch	·	1.7 km	MPC · JPL
630702	2006 KY_{5}	—	May 19, 2006	Mount Lemmon	Mount Lemmon Survey	·	1.7 km	MPC · JPL
630703	2006 KA_{11}	—	October 24, 2003	Kitt Peak	Spacewatch	·	2.6 km	MPC · JPL
630704	2006 KF_{18}	—	May 21, 2006	Kitt Peak	Spacewatch	·	1.5 km	MPC · JPL
630705	2006 KB_{21}	—	May 20, 2006	Kitt Peak	Spacewatch	·	1.3 km	MPC · JPL
630706	2006 KU_{29}	—	May 20, 2006	Kitt Peak	Spacewatch	·	1.7 km	MPC · JPL
630707	2006 KZ_{43}	—	May 21, 2006	Kitt Peak	Spacewatch	·	2.3 km	MPC · JPL
630708	2006 KF_{54}	—	May 21, 2006	Kitt Peak	Spacewatch	·	1.9 km	MPC · JPL
630709	2006 KX_{55}	—	May 21, 2006	Kitt Peak	Spacewatch	·	1.3 km	MPC · JPL
630710	2006 KR_{58}	—	May 22, 2006	Kitt Peak	Spacewatch	·	620 m	MPC · JPL
630711	2006 KS_{59}	—	May 22, 2006	Kitt Peak	Spacewatch	·	1.8 km	MPC · JPL
630712	2006 KS_{60}	—	May 22, 2006	Kitt Peak	Spacewatch	·	2.1 km	MPC · JPL
630713	2006 KJ_{68}	—	May 20, 2006	Mount Lemmon	Mount Lemmon Survey	·	1.9 km	MPC · JPL
630714	2006 KA_{70}	—	May 22, 2006	Kitt Peak	Spacewatch	·	1.1 km	MPC · JPL
630715	2006 KC_{72}	—	May 22, 2006	Kitt Peak	Spacewatch	EOS	2.0 km	MPC · JPL
630716	2006 KS_{79}	—	May 25, 2006	Mount Lemmon	Mount Lemmon Survey	·	1.5 km	MPC · JPL
630717	2006 KJ_{82}	—	May 25, 2006	Mount Lemmon	Mount Lemmon Survey	·	2.4 km	MPC · JPL
630718	2006 KU_{97}	—	May 26, 2006	Kitt Peak	Spacewatch	·	2.1 km	MPC · JPL
630719	2006 KN_{100}	—	May 18, 2006	Palomar	NEAT	·	1.8 km	MPC · JPL
630720	2006 KB_{104}	—	May 25, 2006	Mount Lemmon	Mount Lemmon Survey	EOS	1.4 km	MPC · JPL
630721	2006 KY_{106}	—	May 9, 2006	Mount Lemmon	Mount Lemmon Survey	·	610 m	MPC · JPL
630722	2006 KA_{111}	—	May 31, 2006	Mount Lemmon	Mount Lemmon Survey	3:2	5.2 km	MPC · JPL
630723	2006 KJ_{123}	—	May 25, 2006	Kitt Peak	Spacewatch	·	3.2 km	MPC · JPL
630724	2006 KO_{136}	—	May 23, 2006	Mount Lemmon	Mount Lemmon Survey	·	1.6 km	MPC · JPL
630725	2006 KV_{136}	—	May 25, 2006	Mauna Kea	P. A. Wiegert	·	1.5 km	MPC · JPL
630726	2006 KG_{137}	—	May 23, 2006	Mount Lemmon	Mount Lemmon Survey	EOS	1.8 km	MPC · JPL
630727	2006 KH_{137}	—	October 22, 2003	Kitt Peak	Spacewatch	AST	1.7 km	MPC · JPL
630728	2006 KQ_{138}	—	September 26, 2003	Apache Point	SDSS Collaboration	·	1.1 km	MPC · JPL
630729	2006 KQ_{144}	—	May 24, 2006	Anderson Mesa	LONEOS	·	730 m	MPC · JPL
630730	2006 KF_{146}	—	May 30, 2006	Mount Lemmon	Mount Lemmon Survey	·	930 m	MPC · JPL
630731	2006 KG_{147}	—	January 12, 2016	Haleakala	Pan-STARRS 1	·	2.3 km	MPC · JPL
630732	2006 KH_{147}	—	May 25, 2006	Kitt Peak	Spacewatch	·	560 m	MPC · JPL
630733	2006 KY_{147}	—	November 9, 2013	Mount Lemmon	Mount Lemmon Survey	·	1.4 km	MPC · JPL
630734	2006 KE_{150}	—	October 30, 2017	Haleakala	Pan-STARRS 1	·	570 m	MPC · JPL
630735	2006 KJ_{150}	—	May 26, 2011	Mount Lemmon	Mount Lemmon Survey	EOS	1.4 km	MPC · JPL
630736	2006 KS_{150}	—	August 12, 2015	Charleston	R. Holmes	·	880 m	MPC · JPL
630737	2006 KT_{150}	—	January 5, 2016	Haleakala	Pan-STARRS 1	·	2.5 km	MPC · JPL
630738	2006 KA_{151}	—	July 14, 2013	Haleakala	Pan-STARRS 1	EOS	2.0 km	MPC · JPL
630739	2006 KT_{153}	—	March 1, 2009	Kitt Peak	Spacewatch	·	510 m	MPC · JPL
630740	2006 KA_{156}	—	July 24, 2017	Haleakala	Pan-STARRS 1	·	1.3 km	MPC · JPL
630741	2006 LS_{6}	—	April 13, 2001	Kitt Peak	Spacewatch	BRA	1.9 km	MPC · JPL
630742	2006 LD_{8}	—	February 3, 2012	Haleakala	Pan-STARRS 1	·	660 m	MPC · JPL
630743	2006 LR_{8}	—	September 12, 2013	Mount Lemmon	Mount Lemmon Survey	HYG	2.5 km	MPC · JPL
630744	2006 MH_{1}	—	June 17, 2006	Kitt Peak	Spacewatch	·	1.1 km	MPC · JPL
630745	2006 MM_{7}	—	July 3, 1995	Kitt Peak	Spacewatch	·	3.4 km	MPC · JPL
630746	2006 MP_{15}	—	September 10, 2007	Kitt Peak	Spacewatch	·	2.5 km	MPC · JPL
630747	2006 MU_{15}	—	April 15, 2010	Kitt Peak	Spacewatch	MAR	1.1 km	MPC · JPL
630748	2006 MV_{15}	—	April 15, 2010	Kitt Peak	Spacewatch	·	1.2 km	MPC · JPL
630749	2006 OD	—	July 16, 2006	Altschwendt	W. Ries	·	720 m	MPC · JPL
630750	2006 OD_{3}	—	July 19, 2006	Lulin	LUSS	·	690 m	MPC · JPL
630751	2006 OT_{5}	—	July 23, 2006	Pla D'Arguines	R. Ferrando, Ferrando, M.	·	3.2 km	MPC · JPL
630752	2006 OC_{11}	—	July 20, 2006	Palomar	NEAT	BRG	1.5 km	MPC · JPL
630753	2006 OE_{18}	—	July 16, 2002	Palomar	NEAT	·	1.7 km	MPC · JPL
630754	2006 OQ_{23}	—	August 25, 2001	Kitt Peak	Spacewatch	·	2.1 km	MPC · JPL
630755	2006 OX_{26}	—	July 19, 2006	Mauna Kea	P. A. Wiegert, D. Subasinghe	EOS	2.2 km	MPC · JPL
630756	2006 OL_{27}	—	October 12, 2007	Mount Lemmon	Mount Lemmon Survey	·	2.9 km	MPC · JPL
630757	2006 OU_{27}	—	December 3, 2007	Kitt Peak	Spacewatch	·	920 m	MPC · JPL
630758	2006 OY_{27}	—	July 21, 2006	Mount Lemmon	Mount Lemmon Survey	·	580 m	MPC · JPL
630759	2006 OK_{31}	—	February 16, 2004	Kitt Peak	Spacewatch	·	3.0 km	MPC · JPL
630760	2006 OL_{32}	—	October 7, 2007	Kitt Peak	Spacewatch	·	1.8 km	MPC · JPL
630761	2006 OA_{33}	—	March 10, 2005	Mount Lemmon	Mount Lemmon Survey	·	960 m	MPC · JPL
630762	2006 OF_{36}	—	July 21, 2006	Mount Lemmon	Mount Lemmon Survey	·	2.6 km	MPC · JPL
630763	2006 OT_{37}	—	January 16, 2009	Mount Lemmon	Mount Lemmon Survey	·	2.1 km	MPC · JPL
630764	2006 PY_{1}	—	July 26, 2006	Palomar	NEAT	TIR	3.2 km	MPC · JPL
630765	2006 PR_{6}	—	August 12, 2006	Palomar	NEAT	EOS	2.1 km	MPC · JPL
630766	2006 PM_{7}	—	August 12, 2006	Palomar	NEAT	EUN	1.2 km	MPC · JPL
630767	2006 PV_{7}	—	July 18, 2006	Siding Spring	SSS	·	950 m	MPC · JPL
630768	2006 PR_{8}	—	August 13, 2006	Palomar	NEAT	·	600 m	MPC · JPL
630769	2006 PA_{11}	—	August 13, 2006	Palomar	NEAT	·	2.7 km	MPC · JPL
630770	2006 PJ_{15}	—	August 19, 2006	Kitt Peak	Spacewatch	EUN	1.2 km	MPC · JPL
630771	2006 PJ_{17}	—	August 18, 2006	Kitt Peak	Spacewatch	·	2.1 km	MPC · JPL
630772	2006 PK_{17}	—	August 15, 2006	Lulin	LUSS	EOS	1.8 km	MPC · JPL
630773	2006 PR_{21}	—	July 25, 2006	Palomar	NEAT	·	2.9 km	MPC · JPL
630774	2006 PB_{26}	—	August 13, 2006	Palomar	NEAT	·	3.3 km	MPC · JPL
630775	2006 PY_{30}	—	April 16, 2005	Kitt Peak	Spacewatch	KOR	1.7 km	MPC · JPL
630776	2006 PC_{31}	—	August 13, 2006	Palomar	NEAT	·	2.9 km	MPC · JPL
630777	2006 PH_{31}	—	August 13, 2006	Palomar	NEAT	·	3.8 km	MPC · JPL
630778	2006 PA_{37}	—	July 30, 2006	Lulin	LUSS	·	3.4 km	MPC · JPL
630779	2006 PD_{37}	—	July 25, 2006	Palomar	NEAT	·	3.4 km	MPC · JPL
630780	2006 PX_{39}	—	August 17, 2006	Palomar	NEAT	·	1.5 km	MPC · JPL
630781	2006 PF_{42}	—	August 28, 2006	Siding Spring	SSS	TIR	3.6 km	MPC · JPL
630782	2006 PJ_{44}	—	July 27, 2017	Haleakala	Pan-STARRS 1	·	2.4 km	MPC · JPL
630783	2006 QB	—	August 10, 2006	Palomar	NEAT	·	3.0 km	MPC · JPL
630784	2006 QW	—	July 25, 2006	Palomar	NEAT	·	1.6 km	MPC · JPL
630785	2006 QS_{6}	—	August 17, 2006	Palomar	NEAT	·	3.6 km	MPC · JPL
630786	2006 QO_{8}	—	August 19, 2006	Kitt Peak	Spacewatch	·	2.4 km	MPC · JPL
630787	2006 QW_{12}	—	August 16, 2006	Siding Spring	SSS	·	2.4 km	MPC · JPL
630788	2006 QJ_{15}	—	October 16, 1998	Kitt Peak	Spacewatch	(5)	1.5 km	MPC · JPL
630789	2006 QU_{15}	—	August 17, 2006	Palomar	NEAT	·	1.1 km	MPC · JPL
630790	2006 QC_{19}	—	August 17, 2006	Palomar	NEAT	·	3.5 km	MPC · JPL
630791	2006 QL_{20}	—	July 20, 2006	Palomar	NEAT	·	3.6 km	MPC · JPL
630792	2006 QC_{22}	—	August 19, 2006	Anderson Mesa	LONEOS	·	4.5 km	MPC · JPL
630793	2006 QZ_{23}	—	August 19, 2006	Anderson Mesa	LONEOS	·	700 m	MPC · JPL
630794	2006 QG_{26}	—	August 19, 2006	Palomar	NEAT	·	750 m	MPC · JPL
630795	2006 QC_{35}	—	August 17, 2006	Palomar	NEAT	·	720 m	MPC · JPL
630796	2006 QX_{37}	—	August 16, 2006	Siding Spring	SSS	·	1.0 km	MPC · JPL
630797	2006 QY_{37}	—	August 16, 2006	Siding Spring	SSS	·	1.7 km	MPC · JPL
630798	2006 QN_{40}	—	August 22, 2006	Palomar	NEAT	T_{j} (2.98) · EUP	3.6 km	MPC · JPL
630799	2006 QQ_{41}	—	August 17, 2006	Palomar	NEAT	·	2.3 km	MPC · JPL
630800	2006 QS_{41}	—	August 17, 2006	Palomar	NEAT	·	870 m	MPC · JPL

== 630801–630900 ==
back to top

Designation			Discovery			Properties		Ref
Permanent	Provisional	Named after	Date	Site	Discoverer(s)	Category	Diam.	Ref
630801	2006 QM_{42}	—	August 17, 2006	Palomar	NEAT	·	1.3 km	MPC · JPL
630802	2006 QC_{48}	—	August 21, 2006	Kitt Peak	Spacewatch	·	3.2 km	MPC · JPL
630803	2006 QJ_{58}	—	August 27, 2006	Goodricke-Pigott	R. A. Tucker	·	900 m	MPC · JPL
630804	2006 QT_{67}	—	August 21, 2006	Kitt Peak	Spacewatch	·	2.3 km	MPC · JPL
630805	2006 QW_{67}	—	August 21, 2006	Kitt Peak	Spacewatch	·	2.9 km	MPC · JPL
630806	2006 QY_{75}	—	August 21, 2006	Kitt Peak	Spacewatch	·	1.4 km	MPC · JPL
630807	2006 QN_{76}	—	August 21, 2006	Kitt Peak	Spacewatch	·	990 m	MPC · JPL
630808	2006 QD_{77}	—	October 13, 2002	Kitt Peak	Spacewatch	·	1.2 km	MPC · JPL
630809	2006 QC_{81}	—	August 24, 2006	Palomar	NEAT	·	740 m	MPC · JPL
630810	2006 QS_{85}	—	August 27, 2006	Kitt Peak	Spacewatch	·	4.1 km	MPC · JPL
630811	2006 QY_{85}	—	April 4, 2003	Kitt Peak	Spacewatch	·	2.4 km	MPC · JPL
630812	2006 QU_{86}	—	August 27, 2006	Kitt Peak	Spacewatch	·	1.1 km	MPC · JPL
630813	2006 QL_{87}	—	August 27, 2006	Kitt Peak	Spacewatch	·	2.8 km	MPC · JPL
630814	2006 QA_{94}	—	August 17, 2006	Palomar	NEAT	·	640 m	MPC · JPL
630815	2006 QF_{96}	—	October 15, 2002	Palomar	NEAT	·	1.5 km	MPC · JPL
630816	2006 QG_{96}	—	August 20, 2006	Palomar	NEAT	·	840 m	MPC · JPL
630817	2006 QB_{98}	—	August 22, 2006	Palomar	NEAT	·	2.9 km	MPC · JPL
630818	2006 QY_{102}	—	August 27, 2006	Kitt Peak	Spacewatch	·	2.2 km	MPC · JPL
630819	2006 QW_{103}	—	August 27, 2006	Kitt Peak	Spacewatch	·	2.5 km	MPC · JPL
630820	2006 QW_{107}	—	August 28, 2006	Catalina	CSS	·	2.5 km	MPC · JPL
630821	2006 QW_{109}	—	August 28, 2006	Kitt Peak	Spacewatch	EOS	1.8 km	MPC · JPL
630822	2006 QO_{113}	—	August 24, 2006	Palomar	NEAT	·	2.0 km	MPC · JPL
630823	2006 QX_{120}	—	August 24, 2006	Socorro	LINEAR	·	3.3 km	MPC · JPL
630824	2006 QD_{121}	—	October 17, 2003	Kitt Peak	Spacewatch	·	720 m	MPC · JPL
630825	2006 QM_{126}	—	August 23, 2006	Palomar	NEAT	·	1.5 km	MPC · JPL
630826	2006 QV_{126}	—	August 28, 2006	Lulin	LUSS	·	650 m	MPC · JPL
630827	2006 QT_{131}	—	August 22, 2006	Palomar	NEAT	·	1.7 km	MPC · JPL
630828	2006 QF_{132}	—	August 22, 2006	Palomar	NEAT	·	3.4 km	MPC · JPL
630829	2006 QN_{138}	—	October 22, 2003	Apache Point	SDSS	·	670 m	MPC · JPL
630830	2006 QY_{147}	—	August 18, 2006	Kitt Peak	Spacewatch	·	2.5 km	MPC · JPL
630831	2006 QD_{148}	—	May 10, 2005	Kitt Peak	Spacewatch	·	2.3 km	MPC · JPL
630832	2006 QL_{157}	—	August 19, 2006	Kitt Peak	Spacewatch	·	2.1 km	MPC · JPL
630833	2006 QQ_{178}	—	August 21, 2006	Kitt Peak	Spacewatch	·	630 m	MPC · JPL
630834	2006 QH_{182}	—	September 30, 2006	Mount Lemmon	Mount Lemmon Survey	·	2.4 km	MPC · JPL
630835	2006 QU_{184}	—	August 21, 2006	Kitt Peak	Spacewatch	·	900 m	MPC · JPL
630836	2006 QZ_{188}	—	November 25, 2011	Haleakala	Pan-STARRS 1	·	1.2 km	MPC · JPL
630837	2006 QP_{189}	—	October 10, 2012	Mount Lemmon	Mount Lemmon Survey	·	2.7 km	MPC · JPL
630838	2006 QV_{191}	—	March 18, 2010	Kitt Peak	Spacewatch	·	2.8 km	MPC · JPL
630839	2006 QU_{194}	—	November 6, 2015	ESA OGS	ESA OGS	·	1.3 km	MPC · JPL
630840	2006 QG_{195}	—	January 1, 2008	Kitt Peak	Spacewatch	·	2.2 km	MPC · JPL
630841	2006 QF_{196}	—	September 25, 2012	Mount Lemmon	Mount Lemmon Survey	·	2.2 km	MPC · JPL
630842	2006 QG_{198}	—	January 11, 2008	Mount Lemmon	Mount Lemmon Survey	·	600 m	MPC · JPL
630843	2006 QX_{201}	—	July 25, 2014	Haleakala	Pan-STARRS 1	·	800 m	MPC · JPL
630844	2006 QT_{208}	—	August 28, 2006	Kitt Peak	Spacewatch	HYG	2.4 km	MPC · JPL
630845	2006 RC	—	July 25, 1995	Kitt Peak	Spacewatch	·	2.4 km	MPC · JPL
630846	2006 RG_{3}	—	September 14, 2006	Mauna Kea	D. D. Balam	·	2.2 km	MPC · JPL
630847	2006 RU_{7}	—	August 19, 2006	Kitt Peak	Spacewatch	·	2.7 km	MPC · JPL
630848	2006 RX_{9}	—	September 15, 2006	Socorro	LINEAR	·	890 m	MPC · JPL
630849	2006 RH_{10}	—	September 14, 2006	Catalina	CSS	·	790 m	MPC · JPL
630850	2006 RJ_{10}	—	September 15, 2006	Kitt Peak	Spacewatch	LIX	3.5 km	MPC · JPL
630851	2006 RK_{10}	—	February 16, 2004	Kitt Peak	Spacewatch	·	1.8 km	MPC · JPL
630852	2006 RF_{25}	—	August 29, 2006	Kitt Peak	Spacewatch	·	740 m	MPC · JPL
630853	2006 RR_{27}	—	August 29, 2006	Lulin	LUSS	·	2.0 km	MPC · JPL
630854	2006 RJ_{28}	—	August 29, 2006	Catalina	CSS	·	800 m	MPC · JPL
630855	2006 RT_{30}	—	August 19, 2006	Kitt Peak	Spacewatch	·	1.2 km	MPC · JPL
630856	2006 RD_{47}	—	September 14, 2006	Kitt Peak	Spacewatch	·	2.6 km	MPC · JPL
630857	2006 RS_{63}	—	August 22, 2006	Palomar	NEAT	·	3.7 km	MPC · JPL
630858	2006 RU_{70}	—	September 15, 2006	Kitt Peak	Spacewatch	·	630 m	MPC · JPL
630859	2006 RD_{114}	—	September 14, 2006	Mauna Kea	J. Masiero, R. Jedicke	·	1.2 km	MPC · JPL
630860	2006 RG_{117}	—	September 26, 2006	Kitt Peak	Spacewatch	·	2.5 km	MPC · JPL
630861	2006 RF_{123}	—	September 14, 2006	Catalina	CSS	·	1.5 km	MPC · JPL
630862	2006 RR_{123}	—	September 15, 2006	Kitt Peak	Spacewatch	THM	2.1 km	MPC · JPL
630863	2006 RV_{124}	—	September 14, 2006	Kitt Peak	Spacewatch	·	2.6 km	MPC · JPL
630864	2006 RM_{125}	—	September 15, 2006	Kitt Peak	Spacewatch	·	1.4 km	MPC · JPL
630865	2006 RK_{126}	—	September 15, 2006	Kitt Peak	Spacewatch	HYG	2.3 km	MPC · JPL
630866	2006 SP_{1}	—	September 16, 2006	Kitt Peak	Spacewatch	·	3.0 km	MPC · JPL
630867	2006 SR_{7}	—	September 18, 2006	Vail-Jarnac	Jarnac	·	910 m	MPC · JPL
630868	2006 SK_{10}	—	September 16, 2006	Kitt Peak	Spacewatch	·	2.4 km	MPC · JPL
630869	2006 SN_{10}	—	September 16, 2006	Kitt Peak	Spacewatch	·	2.3 km	MPC · JPL
630870	2006 SQ_{10}	—	September 16, 2006	Kitt Peak	Spacewatch	·	1.5 km	MPC · JPL
630871	2006 SS_{17}	—	September 17, 2006	Kitt Peak	Spacewatch	·	2.5 km	MPC · JPL
630872	2006 SX_{27}	—	September 17, 2006	Kitt Peak	Spacewatch	·	2.5 km	MPC · JPL
630873	2006 SM_{38}	—	September 18, 2006	Kitt Peak	Spacewatch	·	2.2 km	MPC · JPL
630874	2006 SA_{39}	—	September 18, 2006	Kitt Peak	Spacewatch	·	1.4 km	MPC · JPL
630875	2006 SB_{39}	—	September 18, 2006	Catalina	CSS	·	3.1 km	MPC · JPL
630876	2006 SP_{45}	—	September 18, 2006	Kitt Peak	Spacewatch	·	3.0 km	MPC · JPL
630877	2006 SR_{49}	—	December 13, 2001	Palomar	NEAT	EUP	3.7 km	MPC · JPL
630878	2006 SQ_{56}	—	December 1, 2003	Kitt Peak	Spacewatch	·	920 m	MPC · JPL
630879	2006 SV_{57}	—	September 17, 2006	Kitt Peak	Spacewatch	·	580 m	MPC · JPL
630880	2006 SF_{58}	—	September 19, 2006	Kitt Peak	Spacewatch	·	2.5 km	MPC · JPL
630881	2006 SU_{80}	—	September 18, 2006	Kitt Peak	Spacewatch	·	2.1 km	MPC · JPL
630882	2006 SK_{82}	—	September 18, 2006	Kitt Peak	Spacewatch	·	2.2 km	MPC · JPL
630883	2006 SN_{88}	—	September 18, 2006	Kitt Peak	Spacewatch	LIX	3.2 km	MPC · JPL
630884	2006 SA_{104}	—	September 19, 2006	Kitt Peak	Spacewatch	·	2.5 km	MPC · JPL
630885	2006 SK_{104}	—	September 19, 2006	Kitt Peak	Spacewatch	THM	2.0 km	MPC · JPL
630886	2006 SY_{114}	—	September 24, 2006	Kitt Peak	Spacewatch	·	2.3 km	MPC · JPL
630887	2006 SZ_{121}	—	September 18, 2001	Kitt Peak	Spacewatch	·	2.3 km	MPC · JPL
630888	2006 SY_{137}	—	September 20, 2006	Catalina	CSS	·	710 m	MPC · JPL
630889	2006 SF_{142}	—	September 19, 2006	Kitt Peak	Spacewatch	·	2.5 km	MPC · JPL
630890	2006 SD_{143}	—	September 19, 2006	Kitt Peak	Spacewatch	·	1.7 km	MPC · JPL
630891	2006 SU_{143}	—	September 19, 2006	Kitt Peak	Spacewatch	VER	2.2 km	MPC · JPL
630892	2006 SL_{145}	—	September 19, 2006	Kitt Peak	Spacewatch	·	950 m	MPC · JPL
630893	2006 SP_{147}	—	September 19, 2006	Kitt Peak	Spacewatch	·	2.8 km	MPC · JPL
630894	2006 SG_{153}	—	September 20, 2006	Kitt Peak	Spacewatch	·	2.7 km	MPC · JPL
630895	2006 SK_{156}	—	September 15, 2006	Kitt Peak	Spacewatch	·	2.7 km	MPC · JPL
630896	2006 SV_{158}	—	September 19, 2006	Kitt Peak	Spacewatch	·	2.1 km	MPC · JPL
630897	2006 SB_{162}	—	September 24, 2006	Kitt Peak	Spacewatch	THM	1.7 km	MPC · JPL
630898	2006 SX_{164}	—	August 21, 2006	Kitt Peak	Spacewatch	EOS	1.8 km	MPC · JPL
630899	2006 SJ_{165}	—	September 17, 2006	Catalina	CSS	(5)	1.3 km	MPC · JPL
630900	2006 SR_{172}	—	September 25, 2006	Kitt Peak	Spacewatch	·	2.4 km	MPC · JPL

== 630901–631000 ==
back to top

Designation			Discovery			Properties		Ref
Permanent	Provisional	Named after	Date	Site	Discoverer(s)	Category	Diam.	Ref
630901	2006 SH_{174}	—	September 25, 2006	Socorro	LINEAR	·	1.3 km	MPC · JPL
630902	2006 SU_{175}	—	August 28, 2006	Kitt Peak	Spacewatch	EOS	2.0 km	MPC · JPL
630903	2006 SH_{176}	—	September 15, 2006	Kitt Peak	Spacewatch	·	3.2 km	MPC · JPL
630904	2006 SG_{183}	—	September 25, 2006	Mount Lemmon	Mount Lemmon Survey	·	2.8 km	MPC · JPL
630905	2006 SS_{186}	—	September 25, 2006	Mount Lemmon	Mount Lemmon Survey	·	1.6 km	MPC · JPL
630906	2006 SO_{188}	—	September 26, 2006	Kitt Peak	Spacewatch	·	1.3 km	MPC · JPL
630907	2006 SB_{191}	—	September 19, 2006	Kitt Peak	Spacewatch	(29841)	1.2 km	MPC · JPL
630908	2006 SO_{191}	—	September 26, 2006	Mount Lemmon	Mount Lemmon Survey	·	1.4 km	MPC · JPL
630909	2006 SS_{192}	—	September 26, 2006	Mount Lemmon	Mount Lemmon Survey	EUN	1.1 km	MPC · JPL
630910	2006 ST_{202}	—	September 17, 2006	Kitt Peak	Spacewatch	·	1.4 km	MPC · JPL
630911	2006 SR_{203}	—	September 25, 2006	Kitt Peak	Spacewatch	(5)	1.0 km	MPC · JPL
630912	2006 SV_{212}	—	September 19, 2006	Catalina	CSS	·	3.3 km	MPC · JPL
630913	2006 SU_{215}	—	April 11, 1996	Kitt Peak	Spacewatch	·	1.3 km	MPC · JPL
630914	2006 SQ_{220}	—	September 25, 2006	Kitt Peak	Spacewatch	·	1.1 km	MPC · JPL
630915	2006 SD_{222}	—	September 25, 2006	Mount Lemmon	Mount Lemmon Survey	VER	2.3 km	MPC · JPL
630916	2006 SV_{223}	—	September 25, 2006	Mount Lemmon	Mount Lemmon Survey	·	1.4 km	MPC · JPL
630917	2006 SO_{224}	—	August 19, 2006	Kitt Peak	Spacewatch	(5)	1.1 km	MPC · JPL
630918	2006 SQ_{224}	—	August 30, 2006	Anderson Mesa	LONEOS	·	3.7 km	MPC · JPL
630919	2006 SP_{232}	—	September 18, 2006	Kitt Peak	Spacewatch	·	1.0 km	MPC · JPL
630920	2006 SW_{232}	—	September 26, 2006	Kitt Peak	Spacewatch	·	2.6 km	MPC · JPL
630921	2006 SL_{237}	—	September 26, 2006	Mount Lemmon	Mount Lemmon Survey	URS	3.1 km	MPC · JPL
630922	2006 SZ_{241}	—	September 26, 2006	Mount Lemmon	Mount Lemmon Survey	·	2.1 km	MPC · JPL
630923	2006 SM_{243}	—	September 18, 2006	Kitt Peak	Spacewatch	·	2.3 km	MPC · JPL
630924	2006 SS_{246}	—	September 15, 2006	Kitt Peak	Spacewatch	THM	2.0 km	MPC · JPL
630925	2006 SL_{253}	—	September 26, 2006	Mount Lemmon	Mount Lemmon Survey	·	2.7 km	MPC · JPL
630926	2006 SZ_{255}	—	September 26, 2006	Kitt Peak	Spacewatch	·	2.8 km	MPC · JPL
630927	2006 SJ_{265}	—	September 26, 2006	Kitt Peak	Spacewatch	·	2.8 km	MPC · JPL
630928	2006 SN_{265}	—	September 26, 2006	Kitt Peak	Spacewatch	EOS	1.7 km	MPC · JPL
630929	2006 SK_{266}	—	September 26, 2006	Kitt Peak	Spacewatch	·	1.4 km	MPC · JPL
630930	2006 SR_{266}	—	September 26, 2006	Kitt Peak	Spacewatch	·	2.0 km	MPC · JPL
630931	2006 SF_{273}	—	September 17, 2006	Kitt Peak	Spacewatch	·	2.4 km	MPC · JPL
630932	2006 SY_{275}	—	August 29, 2006	Kitt Peak	Spacewatch	·	1.3 km	MPC · JPL
630933	2006 SQ_{277}	—	September 28, 2006	Kitt Peak	Spacewatch	·	650 m	MPC · JPL
630934	2006 SH_{281}	—	September 26, 2006	Moletai	K. Černis, Zdanavicius, J.	·	3.5 km	MPC · JPL
630935	2006 SV_{286}	—	September 22, 2006	San Marcello	San Marcello	WIT	1.2 km	MPC · JPL
630936	2006 ST_{288}	—	September 26, 2006	Catalina	CSS	·	3.0 km	MPC · JPL
630937	2006 SX_{288}	—	September 26, 2006	Catalina	CSS	EOS	2.0 km	MPC · JPL
630938	2006 SQ_{289}	—	November 12, 2001	Apache Point	SDSS Collaboration	EOS	2.7 km	MPC · JPL
630939	2006 SL_{292}	—	September 25, 2006	Kitt Peak	Spacewatch	·	2.5 km	MPC · JPL
630940	2006 SW_{293}	—	September 25, 2006	Kitt Peak	Spacewatch	·	2.0 km	MPC · JPL
630941	2006 SZ_{298}	—	September 26, 2006	Kitt Peak	Spacewatch	·	2.7 km	MPC · JPL
630942	2006 SW_{305}	—	September 27, 2006	Kitt Peak	Spacewatch	VER	2.1 km	MPC · JPL
630943	2006 SM_{307}	—	September 27, 2006	Kitt Peak	Spacewatch	·	2.5 km	MPC · JPL
630944	2006 SE_{309}	—	September 17, 2006	Kitt Peak	Spacewatch	·	790 m	MPC · JPL
630945	2006 SO_{309}	—	September 27, 2006	Kitt Peak	Spacewatch	·	2.7 km	MPC · JPL
630946	2006 SH_{311}	—	September 17, 2006	Kitt Peak	Spacewatch	EOS	1.7 km	MPC · JPL
630947	2006 SJ_{311}	—	September 27, 2006	Kitt Peak	Spacewatch	·	600 m	MPC · JPL
630948	2006 SC_{318}	—	September 17, 2006	Kitt Peak	Spacewatch	EOS	1.8 km	MPC · JPL
630949	2006 SG_{318}	—	September 17, 2006	Kitt Peak	Spacewatch	·	3.0 km	MPC · JPL
630950	2006 SQ_{322}	—	September 17, 2006	Kitt Peak	Spacewatch	·	1.3 km	MPC · JPL
630951	2006 SS_{337}	—	September 28, 2006	Kitt Peak	Spacewatch	·	1.4 km	MPC · JPL
630952	2006 SH_{344}	—	September 28, 2006	Kitt Peak	Spacewatch	·	720 m	MPC · JPL
630953	2006 SJ_{344}	—	September 28, 2006	Kitt Peak	Spacewatch	HYG	2.1 km	MPC · JPL
630954	2006 SK_{344}	—	September 28, 2006	Kitt Peak	Spacewatch	·	2.8 km	MPC · JPL
630955	2006 SQ_{346}	—	September 28, 2006	Kitt Peak	Spacewatch	·	1.5 km	MPC · JPL
630956	2006 SH_{351}	—	September 30, 2006	Catalina	CSS	·	1.4 km	MPC · JPL
630957	2006 SD_{352}	—	September 30, 2006	Catalina	CSS	·	770 m	MPC · JPL
630958	2006 SH_{364}	—	September 28, 2006	Mount Lemmon	Mount Lemmon Survey	·	780 m	MPC · JPL
630959	2006 ST_{376}	—	September 17, 2006	Apache Point	SDSS Collaboration	·	2.5 km	MPC · JPL
630960	2006 SH_{377}	—	September 17, 2006	Apache Point	SDSS Collaboration	EOS	1.7 km	MPC · JPL
630961	2006 SX_{379}	—	September 27, 2006	Apache Point	SDSS Collaboration	·	2.9 km	MPC · JPL
630962	2006 SQ_{381}	—	October 2, 2006	Mount Lemmon	Mount Lemmon Survey	·	2.1 km	MPC · JPL
630963	2006 SO_{385}	—	September 29, 2006	Apache Point	SDSS Collaboration	MAR	850 m	MPC · JPL
630964	2006 SD_{386}	—	September 29, 2006	Apache Point	SDSS Collaboration	·	1.3 km	MPC · JPL
630965	2006 SL_{387}	—	September 17, 2006	Apache Point	SDSS Collaboration	HYG	2.2 km	MPC · JPL
630966	2006 SR_{387}	—	September 30, 2006	Apache Point	SDSS Collaboration	·	2.8 km	MPC · JPL
630967	2006 SE_{388}	—	August 28, 2006	Apache Point	SDSS Collaboration	·	3.3 km	MPC · JPL
630968	2006 SX_{402}	—	September 26, 2006	Mount Lemmon	Mount Lemmon Survey	·	3.1 km	MPC · JPL
630969	2006 SK_{410}	—	September 17, 2006	Kitt Peak	Spacewatch	·	2.3 km	MPC · JPL
630970	2006 SV_{416}	—	November 12, 2007	Mount Lemmon	Mount Lemmon Survey	·	2.9 km	MPC · JPL
630971	2006 SE_{417}	—	September 18, 2006	Mauna Kea	P. A. Wiegert	ADE	1.5 km	MPC · JPL
630972	2006 SG_{417}	—	February 20, 2015	Haleakala	Pan-STARRS 1	·	3.3 km	MPC · JPL
630973	2006 SM_{420}	—	June 29, 2014	Haleakala	Pan-STARRS 1	MAR	940 m	MPC · JPL
630974	2006 SP_{420}	—	January 11, 2008	Mount Lemmon	Mount Lemmon Survey	·	790 m	MPC · JPL
630975	2006 SQ_{421}	—	May 17, 2009	Kitt Peak	Spacewatch	·	840 m	MPC · JPL
630976	2006 SH_{422}	—	September 19, 1993	Kitt Peak	Spacewatch	(1547)	1.8 km	MPC · JPL
630977	2006 SM_{423}	—	September 27, 2006	Catalina	CSS	·	2.1 km	MPC · JPL
630978	2006 SZ_{423}	—	September 28, 2006	Mount Lemmon	Mount Lemmon Survey	·	1.4 km	MPC · JPL
630979	2006 SP_{424}	—	September 30, 2006	Mount Lemmon	Mount Lemmon Survey	·	650 m	MPC · JPL
630980	2006 SV_{424}	—	September 25, 2006	Anderson Mesa	LONEOS	·	670 m	MPC · JPL
630981	2006 SA_{425}	—	September 30, 2006	Mount Lemmon	Mount Lemmon Survey	BAP	990 m	MPC · JPL
630982	2006 SJ_{425}	—	October 17, 2012	Haleakala	Pan-STARRS 1	·	2.6 km	MPC · JPL
630983	2006 SP_{426}	—	September 18, 2006	Kitt Peak	Spacewatch	·	3.1 km	MPC · JPL
630984	2006 SX_{426}	—	September 30, 2006	Mount Lemmon	Mount Lemmon Survey	EOS	1.9 km	MPC · JPL
630985	2006 SY_{426}	—	September 18, 2006	Kitt Peak	Spacewatch	·	2.1 km	MPC · JPL
630986	2006 SJ_{427}	—	January 29, 2009	Kitt Peak	Spacewatch	·	2.6 km	MPC · JPL
630987	2006 SC_{429}	—	September 26, 2006	Mount Lemmon	Mount Lemmon Survey	VER	2.4 km	MPC · JPL
630988	2006 SQ_{433}	—	September 17, 2006	Kitt Peak	Spacewatch	·	1.4 km	MPC · JPL
630989	2006 SR_{433}	—	September 28, 2006	Kitt Peak	Spacewatch	·	1.4 km	MPC · JPL
630990	2006 SN_{434}	—	September 14, 2012	Kitt Peak	Spacewatch	·	2.2 km	MPC · JPL
630991	2006 SL_{435}	—	July 26, 2017	Haleakala	Pan-STARRS 1	·	2.7 km	MPC · JPL
630992	2006 SU_{435}	—	June 5, 2018	Haleakala	Pan-STARRS 1	·	1 km	MPC · JPL
630993	2006 SV_{439}	—	July 21, 2006	Mount Lemmon	Mount Lemmon Survey	·	3.1 km	MPC · JPL
630994	2006 SN_{440}	—	October 8, 2012	Mount Lemmon	Mount Lemmon Survey	·	2.2 km	MPC · JPL
630995	2006 SA_{441}	—	September 15, 2017	Haleakala	Pan-STARRS 1	·	880 m	MPC · JPL
630996	2006 SP_{442}	—	September 19, 2006	Kitt Peak	Spacewatch	·	1.1 km	MPC · JPL
630997	2006 SR_{442}	—	September 19, 2006	Kitt Peak	Spacewatch	·	2.1 km	MPC · JPL
630998	2006 SC_{443}	—	August 12, 2010	Kitt Peak	Spacewatch	EUN	900 m	MPC · JPL
630999	2006 SC_{444}	—	March 1, 2009	Mount Lemmon	Mount Lemmon Survey	·	2.3 km	MPC · JPL
631000	2006 SM_{444}	—	February 1, 2009	Kitt Peak	Spacewatch	·	2.2 km	MPC · JPL

back to top
