= Nançay Radio Observatory =

Radio observatory in France

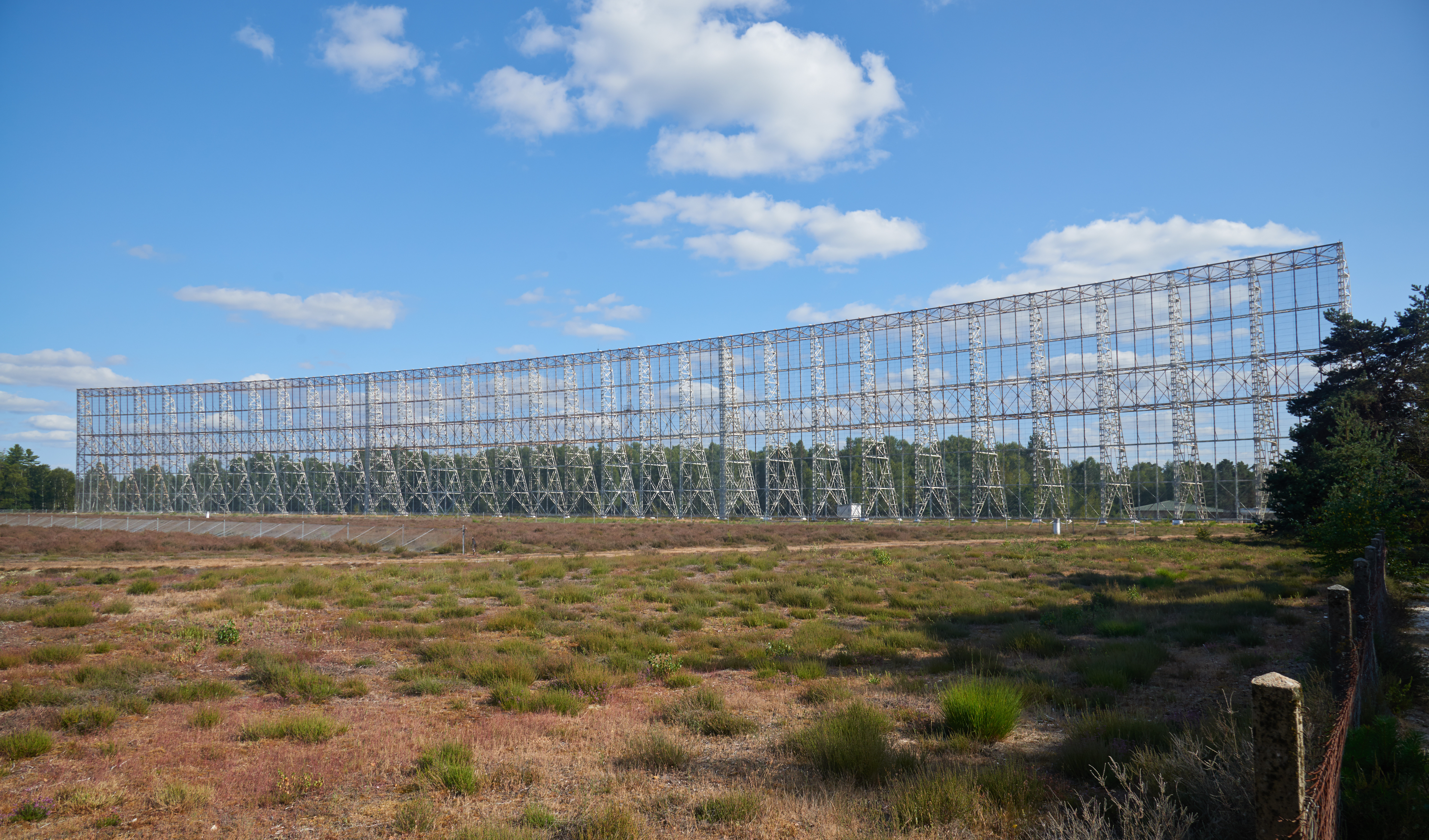
- The secondary mirror of the Great Radiotelescope at Nançay
- Alternative names: Nancay station
- Location: Nançay, Cher, Centre-Val de Loire, metropolitan France, France
- Coordinates: 47°22′50″N 2°11′42″E
- Website: www.obs-nancay.fr
- Telescopes: Nançay Decameter Array; Nançay Radio Heliograph; NenuFAR; Nançay Radio Telescope
- Related media on Commons

The Nançay Radio Observatory (in French: Station de Radioastronomie de Nançay), opened in 1956, is part of Paris Observatory, and also associated with the University of Orléans. It is located in the department of Cher in the Sologne region of France. The station consists of several instruments. Most iconic of these is the large decimetric radio telescope, which is one of the largest radio telescopes in the world. Long established are also the radio heliograph, a T-shaped array, and the decametric array operating at wavelengths between 3 m and 30 m.

== History ==
Radio astronomy emerged worldwide after the Second World War, when radar experts and surplus equipment became available for civilian use. The physics department of the École Normale Superieure was given three 7.5 m diameter Würzburg Riese that the British had seized from the Germans during the war. These were initially deployed at a research centre of the French navy at Marcoussis.

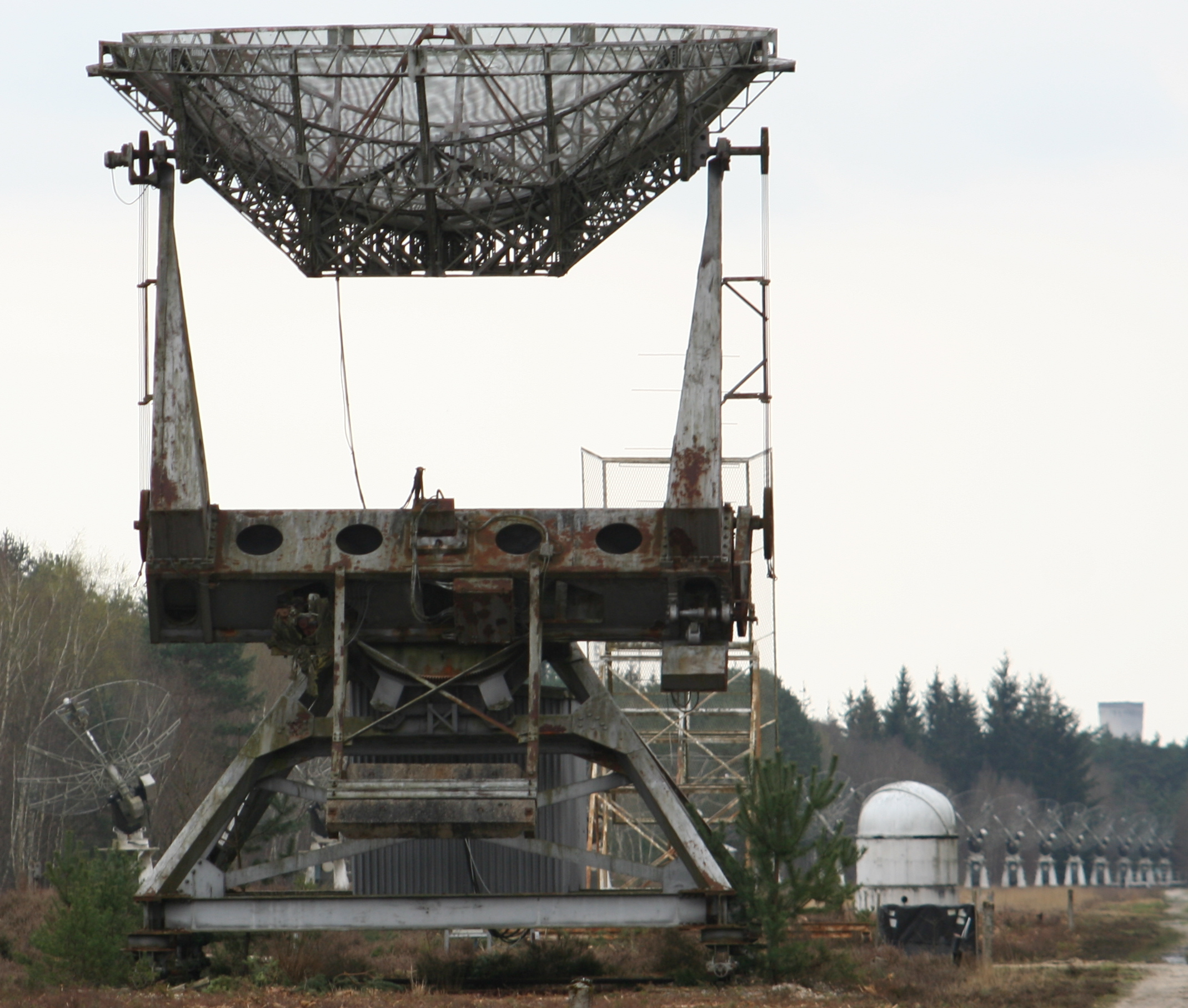
One of the Würzburg Riese antennas at Nançay.

It was recognised that radio astronomy required a large, flat and remote site to accommodate antennas spread over distances of 1.5–2 km or of considerable size, and to avoid unwanted radio waves from human technology. A 150 ha plot of woodland near Nançay became available and was purchased in 1953. Initially, various small instruments – single dishes and interferometers – were installed. 6 m wide railway tracks, one running east–west and one north–south were constructed, which would carry the equatorially mounted 40 t Würzburg antennas.

A predecessor to the current heliograph had 16 antennas of 5 m diameter spread equally along a 1500 m long east–west baseline, while eight antennas of 6 m in diameter were aligned north–south. The frequency observed was 169 MHz (1.77 m wavelength).

After the discovery of the 21 cm line in 1951 and the prospect of observing interstellar and extragalactic line emission and absorption, the need for more sensitive radio telescopes arose; their larger size would also deliver higher angular resolution. The plan for this "large radio telescope" was derived from a 1956 design by John D. Kraus. This design made possible a large collecting area and high resolution in one direction, with only moderate need for moving parts. Disadvantages were the restriction to the meridian and the asymmetric angular resolution that would be much coarser in altitude than in azimuth. The altitude control initially proved very difficult.

== The large radio telescope ==
Layout of the large radio telescope.

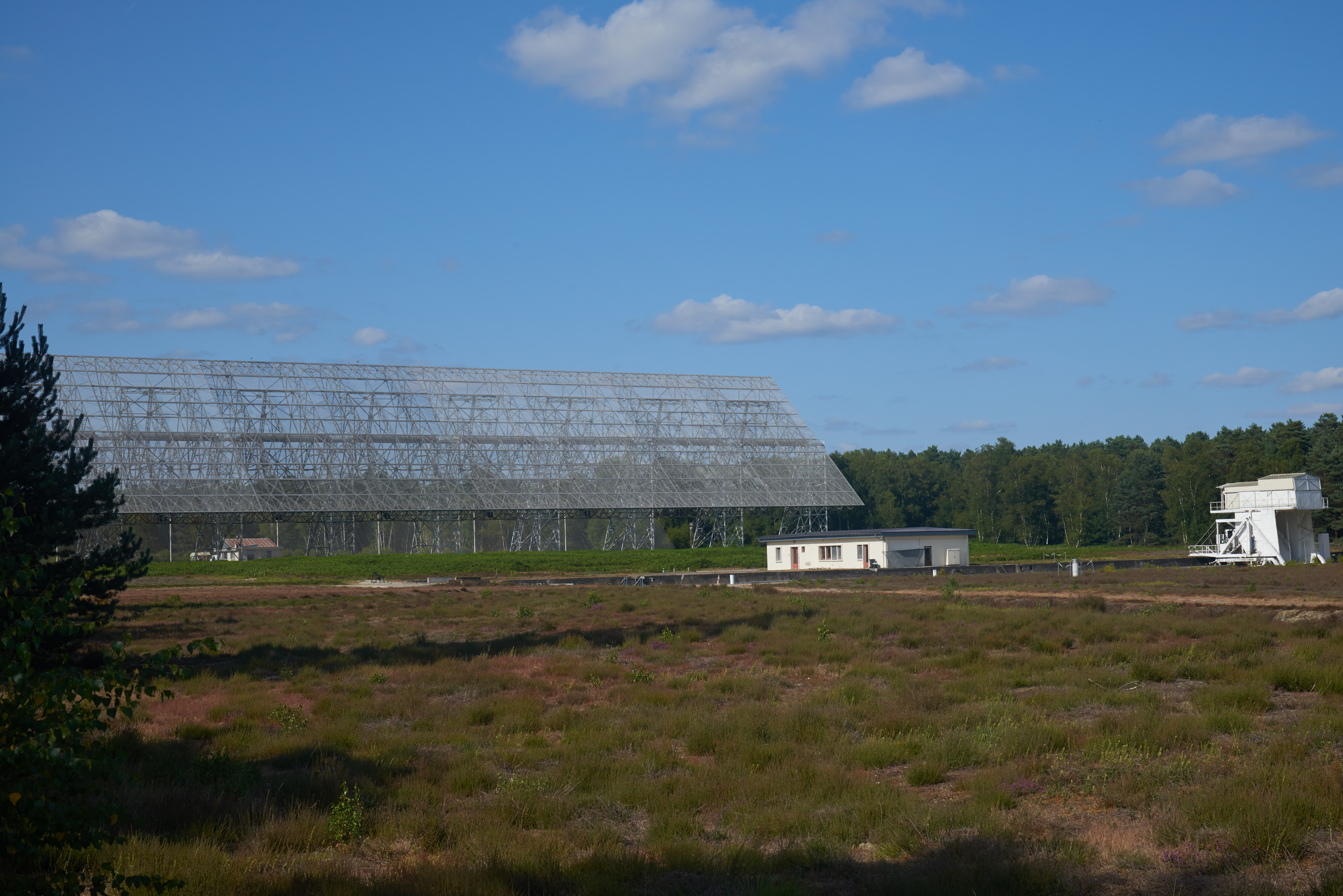
The primary mirror and focal cabin.

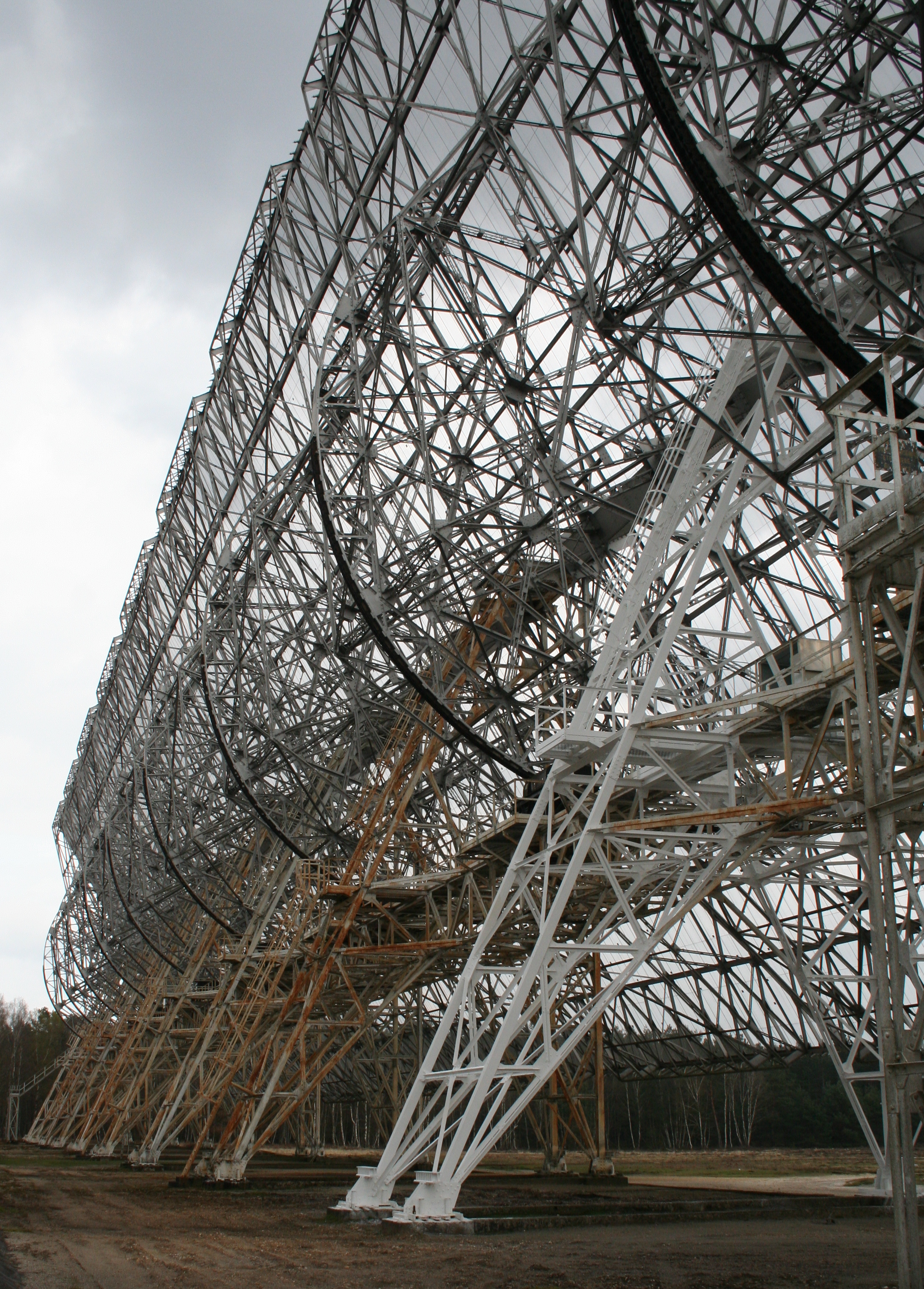
The rear of the tilting primary mirror.

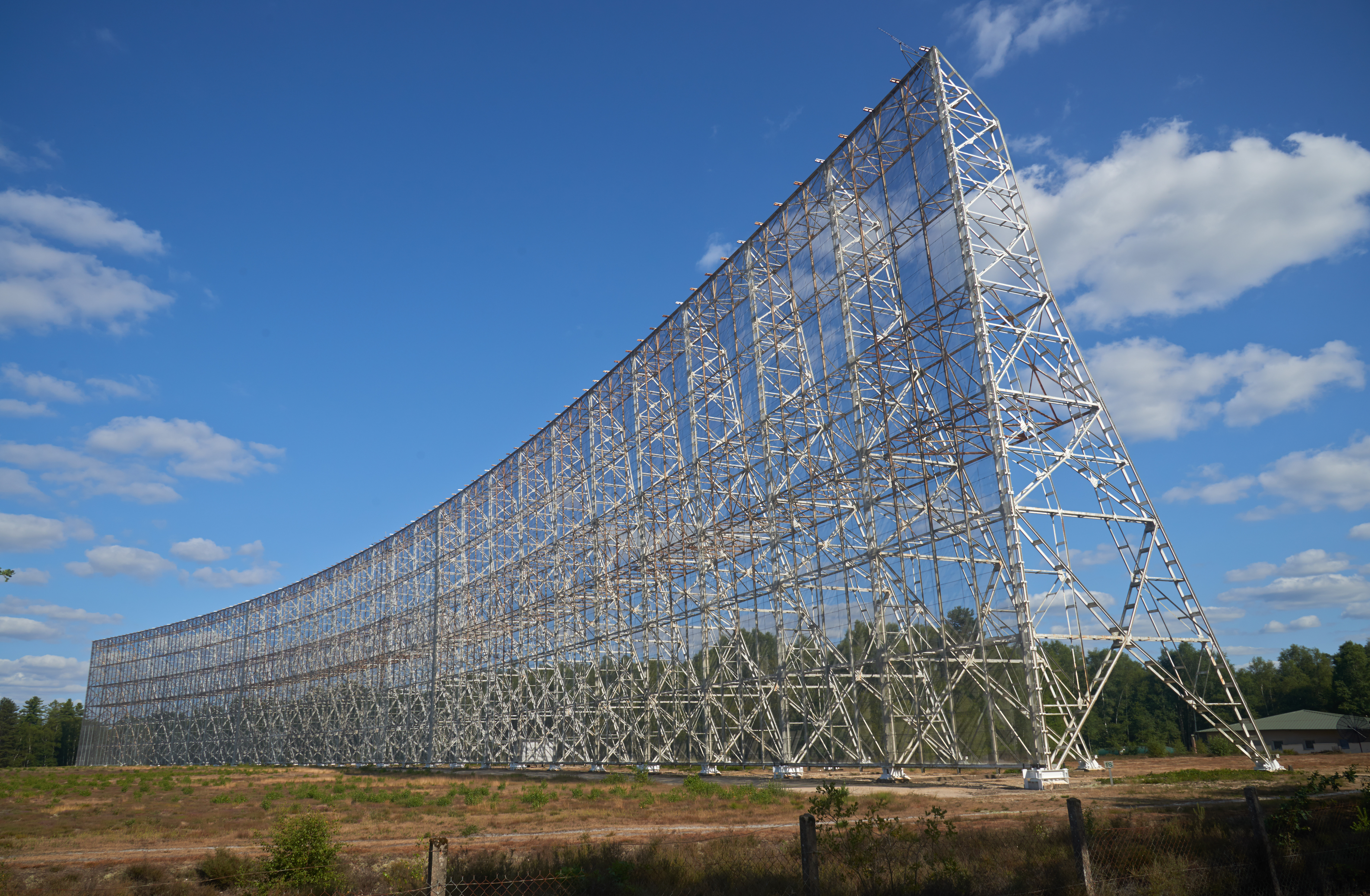
The spherical secondary mirror.

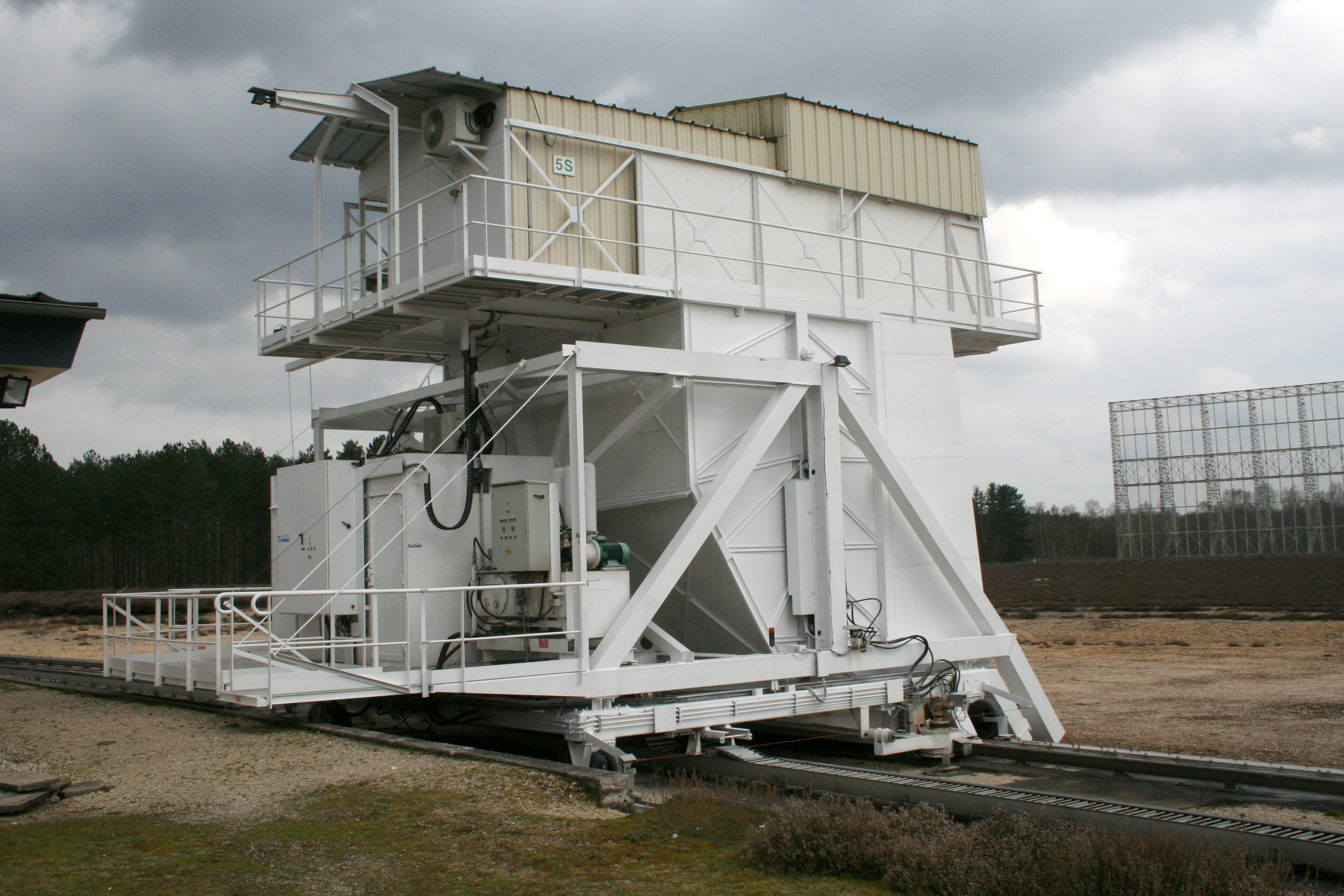
The movable focal cabin.

The large radio telescope (in French: le Grand Radiotélescope, or affectionately le Grand Miroir) was constructed between 1960 and 1965. Initially, only the central 20% of the primary and secondary mirrors were erected as a proof of concept. The mirrors were extended to their full, current size in 1964 and the telescope was officially opened in 1965 by Charles de Gaulle. Scientific observations began in 1967.

The large radio telescope is a transit telescope of the Kraus-type design. The primary mirror at the north end of the installation is a planar mirror measuring 200 m in width and 40 m in height. This is tiltable to adjust to the altitude of the observed object. It consists of five 20 m wide segments, each of 40 t mass. The radio waves are reflected horizontally into the secondary mirror 460 m to the South. The shape of the secondary is that of a segment of a sphere 300 m wide and 35 m high. The secondary reflects the radio waves back into its focal point 280 m to its North and about 60% the distance back to the primary. A cabin with further mirrors and the receiver is located at the focus. During an observation, the cabin is moved west to east to track the observed object for about an hour around its transit through the meridian.

The primary and secondary mirrors are formed by metal wire mesh with holes of 12.5 mm. The reflecting surfaces are accurate to 4 mm, permitting use at wavelengths upwards of about 8 cm. The telescope is thus designed for decimeter waves, including the 21 cm spectral line of neutral atomic hydrogen (HI) and the 18 cm spectral line of the OH radical.

The radio wave detector is cooled to 20 K to reduce noise from the receiver and thereby to improve sensitivity to the celestial radiation.

The large radio telescope observes at frequencies between 1.1 GHz and 3.5 GHz, continuum emission as well as spectral emission or absorption lines. The autocorrelator spectrometer can observe eight spectra at different frequencies with 1024 channels each and a spectral resolution of 0.3 kHz. The instrument is particularly suited to large statistical surveys and the monitoring of objects of variable brightness.

Observational projects include:

- 21 cm HI emission of galaxies to study their rotation, distance, clustering and movement. This includes galaxies obscured in visible light by the Milky Way, blue compact galaxies, galaxies of low surface brightness (in visible light), and active galactic nuclei.
- Pulsars, including pulse timing, distance, and the interstellar medium on the lightpath to Earth. Nançay is part of the European Pulsar Timing Array
- Stellar envelopes, eruptive stars and red giants.
- 18 cm OH emission and absorption in comets to determine their loss rate of water and gas.

== The radio heliograph ==
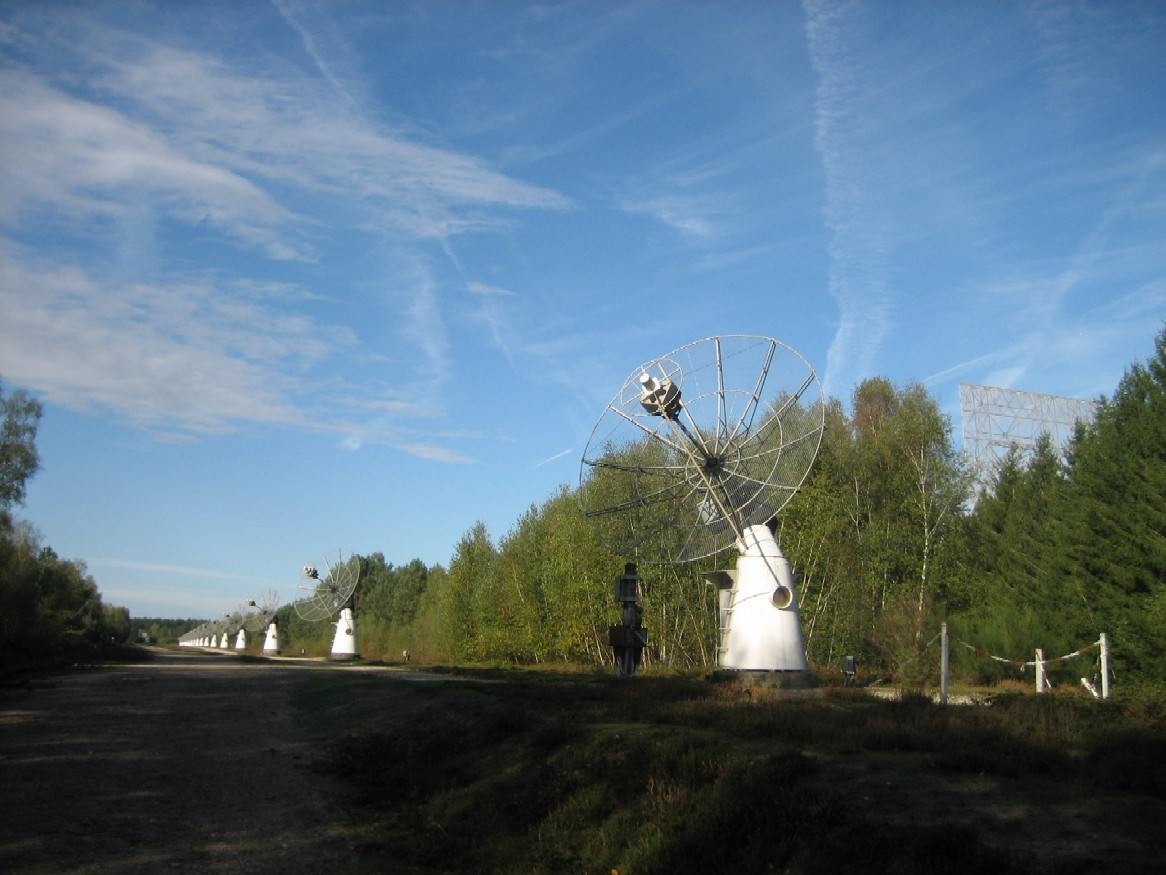
Looking north along the radio heliograph.

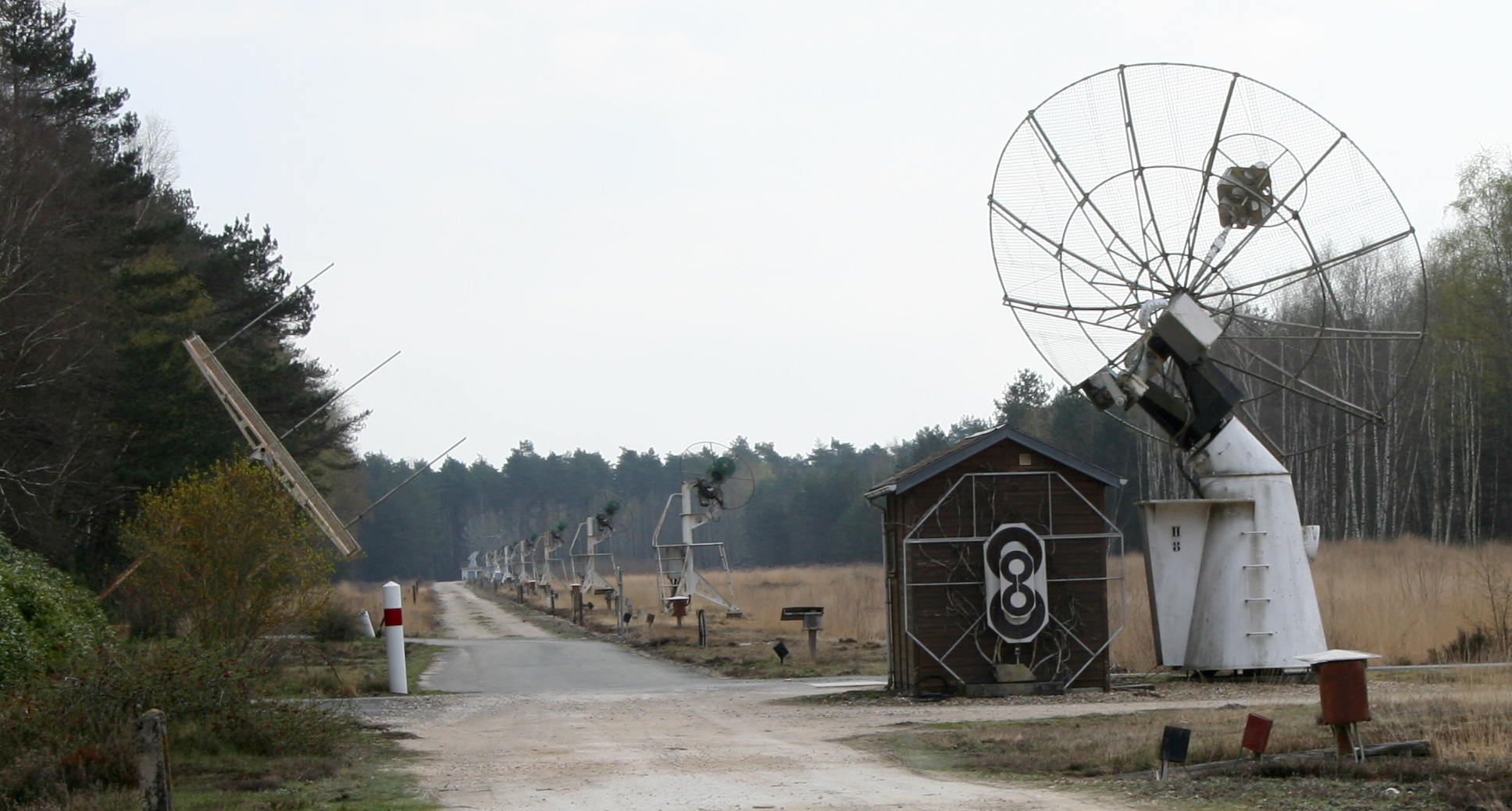
Looking east along the radio heliograph.

The heliograph is a T-shaped interferometer made up of equatorially mounted antennas of several metres (mostly 5 m) diameter. 19 antennas are located on an east–west baseline 3.2 km long, 25 antennas are on a north–south baseline 2.5 km long. The instrument observes the Sun seven hours a day to produce images of the corona in the frequency range 150 MHz to 450 MHz (wavelengths of 2 m to 0.67 m). The angular resolution is then similar to that of the naked eye in visible light. Up to 200 images per second can be taken. This allows the systematic study of the quiet corona, solar flares and coronal mass ejections.

The Nançay observations complement simultaneous observations by space probes in visible and ultraviolet light and in X rays.

== The decametric array ==
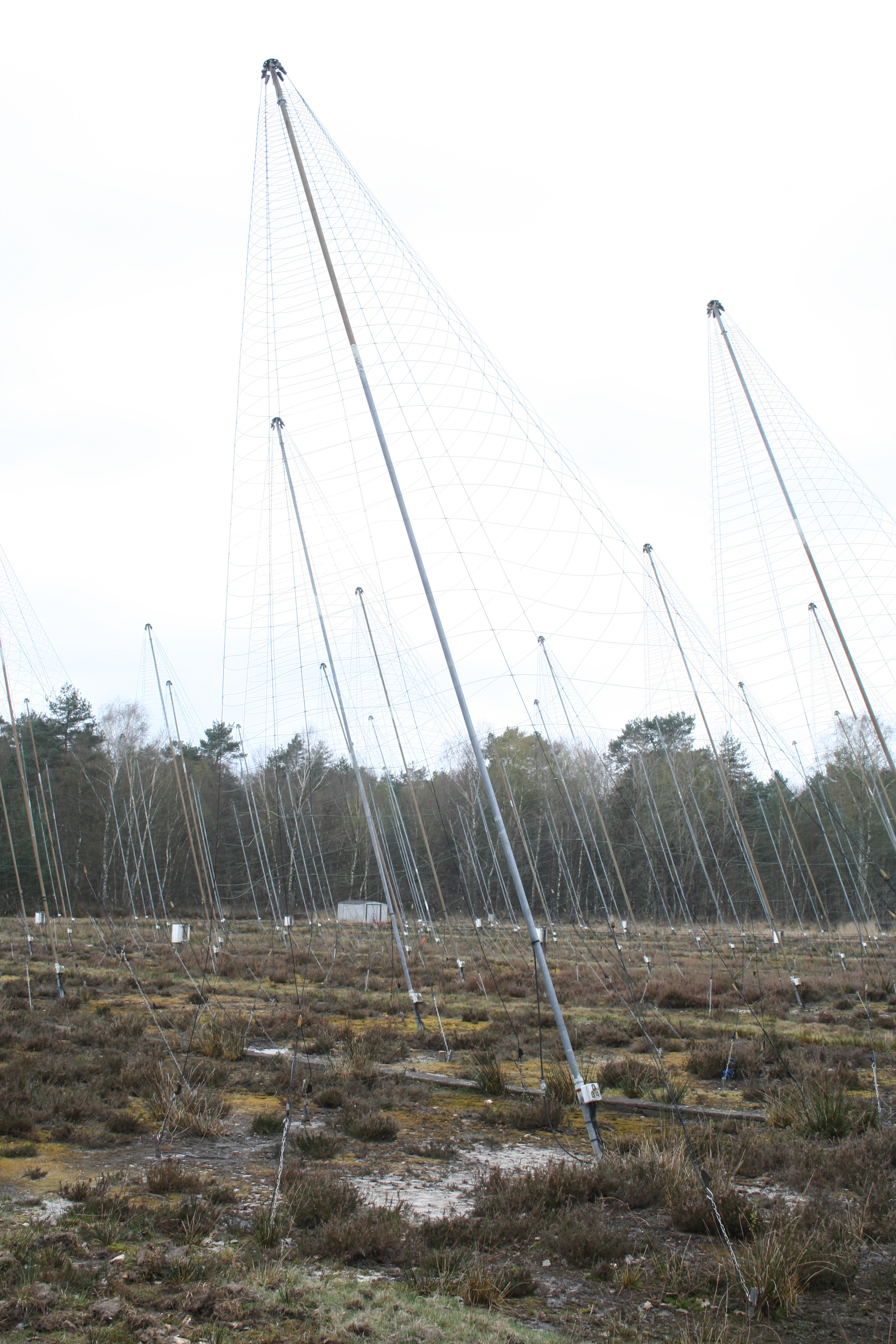
The decametric array.

The decametric array was constructed between 1974 and 1977. It consists of 144 spiral antennas, which are made from conducting cables spun in spiral curves around conical support structures. At their base the cones are 5 m in diameter and they are 9 m tall; they are inclined 20° to the South. The cones are spread over an area of about a hectare. Half the cones are coiled in the opposite sense than the other, permitting the distinction between left and right circularly polarised radio waves. In each polarisation the collecting area is about 3500 m^{2}, equivalent to a 67 m diameter dish. The instrument is sensitive to wavelengths between 3 m and 30 m, which are the longest radio waves observable through the ionosphere. The instrument is not an interferometer, but a phased array. A single dish antenna for these long wavelengths would have to be infeasibly large. Further, a phased array can be re-pointed at a different direction of observation instantaneously by changing the electronic signal delays between the individual antennas.

The angular resolution is about 7° by 14°. The decametric array does not create images, but observes a single spectrum from the sky position observed and records its change with time. The two principal objects are the upper corona of the Sun and the magnetosphere of Jupiter, which have both been observed almost daily since 1977. The temporal changes of signals from the Sun and Jupiter are very rapid, so that at Nançay very fast receivers have been developed for these observations.

The Nançay observations of Jupiter complement the results from space missions like Voyager and Galileo.

== LOFAR and NenuFAR ==
LOFAR consists of about 50 antenna arrays, or "stations", throughout Europe, one of which is in Nançay. These are connected by high-speed Internet link to a computer in the Netherlands. It is optimised for 110 MHz to 250 MHz (2.7 m to 1.2 m), but still has modest performance at 30 MHz to 80 MHz (10 m to 3.7 m).

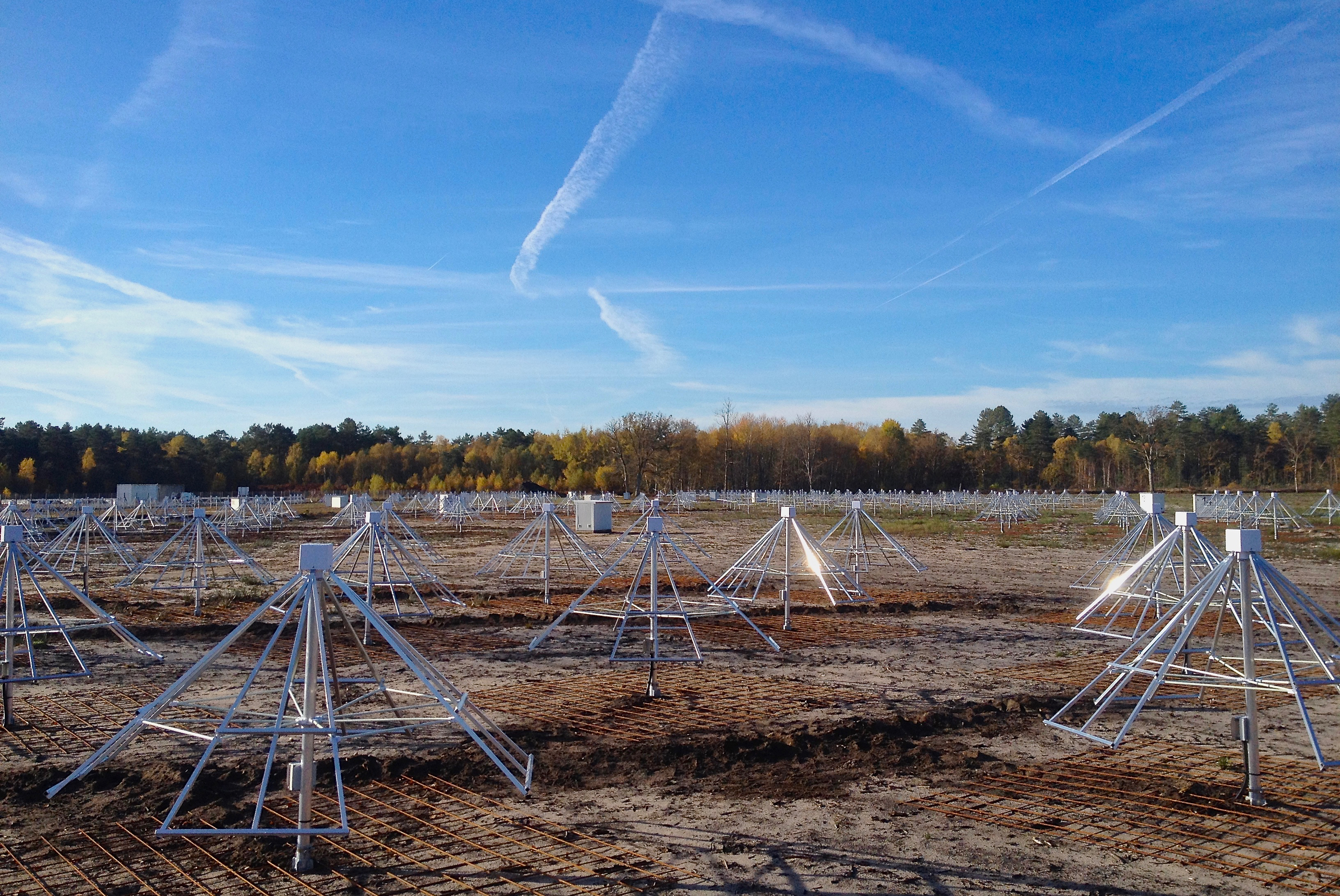
Antennas of the NenuFAR core.

NenuFAR (New Extension in Nançay Upgrading LOFAR) is a very low-frequency phased array optimised for the frequency range from 10 MHz to 85 MHz (30 m to 4 m). These are the longest radio waves not blocked by the ionosphere. Early science operations should begin in 2019. The main scientific objectives are:

- detection and study of (magnetospheres of) exoplanets at radio wavelengths,
- detection of the epoch of formation of the first stars and galaxies some 100 million years after the Big Bang, when the neutral atomic hydrogen was reionised,
- the study of pulsars, including spectroscopy, across the Milky Way, at low frequencies.

When complete, there will be 1938 antennas. Most will be in a core of 400 m diameter, but 114 antennas will be spread to up to 3 km distance.

NenuFAR will be a triple instrument:

- a radio telescope observing multiple positions simultaneously,
- an autonomous radio imager, building radio images of 1° resolution in seconds and of 10' in hours,
- a LOFAR "superstation", i.e. a large extension of the Nançay LOFAR station allowing the combination of NenuFAR and LOFAR to make radio images of sub-arcsecond resolution.

== Other instruments and collaborations ==
In recent years and decades, projects of astronomical observation have become international co-operations, due to the necessary pooling of expertise and funding. In some cases, telescopes also extend across multiple countries. As such, developments at Nançay in the 21st century tend to be the provision of a site for parts of larger instruments, such as LOFAR, and contribution of expertise to international collaborations such as LOFAR and the Square Kilometre Array (SKA).

=== EMBRACE ===
Located at Nançay and Westerbork, EMBRACE (Electronic Multibeam Radio Astronomy Concept) is a prototype installation for phase 2 of the SKA. It is a phased array of 4608 antennas that operate between 900 MHz and 1500 MHz. These are sheltered in a 70 m^{2} radio dome. With multiple beams, several sky locations can be observed at the same time.

=== ORFEES ===
ORFEES (Observation Radiospéctrale pour FEDOME et les Etudes des Eruptions Solaires) is a 5 m diameter antenna dedicated to space weather and prediction of solar flares. It observes the solar corona daily between 130 MHz and 1 GHz and can monitor the radio emission of the Sun in near real time.

=== CODALEMA ===
CODALEMA (Cosmic ray Detection Array with Logarithmic ElectroMagnetic Antennas) is a set of instruments to try and detect ultra-high energy cosmic rays, which cause cascades of particles in the atmosphere. These air showers generate very brief electromagnetic signals that are measured in a wide frequency band from 20 MHz to 200 MHz. An array of about 50 antennas is spread over a large area of the site.

=== Monitoring antenna ===
An antenna, situated above the treetops on a 22 m high mast, has been monitoring the radioelectric quality of the Nançay site for 20 years. It allows to identify interference that affects the observations by the radio heliograph and the decametric array. The bands from 100 MHz to 4000 MHz are observed in their entirety and in multiple directions.

== Pôle des Étoiles ==
The large radio telescope, a number of display panels about the observatory, and one or two of the heliograph antennas can be seen from the car park of the visitor centre Pôle des Étoiles. During opening times, the visitor centre offers a permanent exhibition about astronomy and the work of the observatory. Once daily there is also a planetarium show and a guided tour of the large radio telescope and the radio heliograph.

== See also ==
- List of astronomical observatories
- List of radio telescopes
