= Karst (disambiguation) =

Karst usually refers to karst topography, a landscape shaped by the dissolution of layers of soluble bedrock.

Karst may also refer to the following:

- Karst (surname)
- Karst Plateau (Slovene: Kras), a limestone plateau region in Italy and Slovenia
- 22868 Karst, an asteroid
- KARST (Kilometer-square Area Radio Synthesis Telescope), Chinese telescope
- Karst, a character in Nintendo's Golden Sun video game series

== See also ==
- P.Karst, the taxonomic abbreviation referring to Petter Adolf Karsten
- Slovak Karst, a mountain range in Slovakia
- Karst Trail, a footpath in Germany
- Kaarst, Germany
