= B3 0309+411B =

Radio galaxy in the constellation of Perseus

B3 0309+411
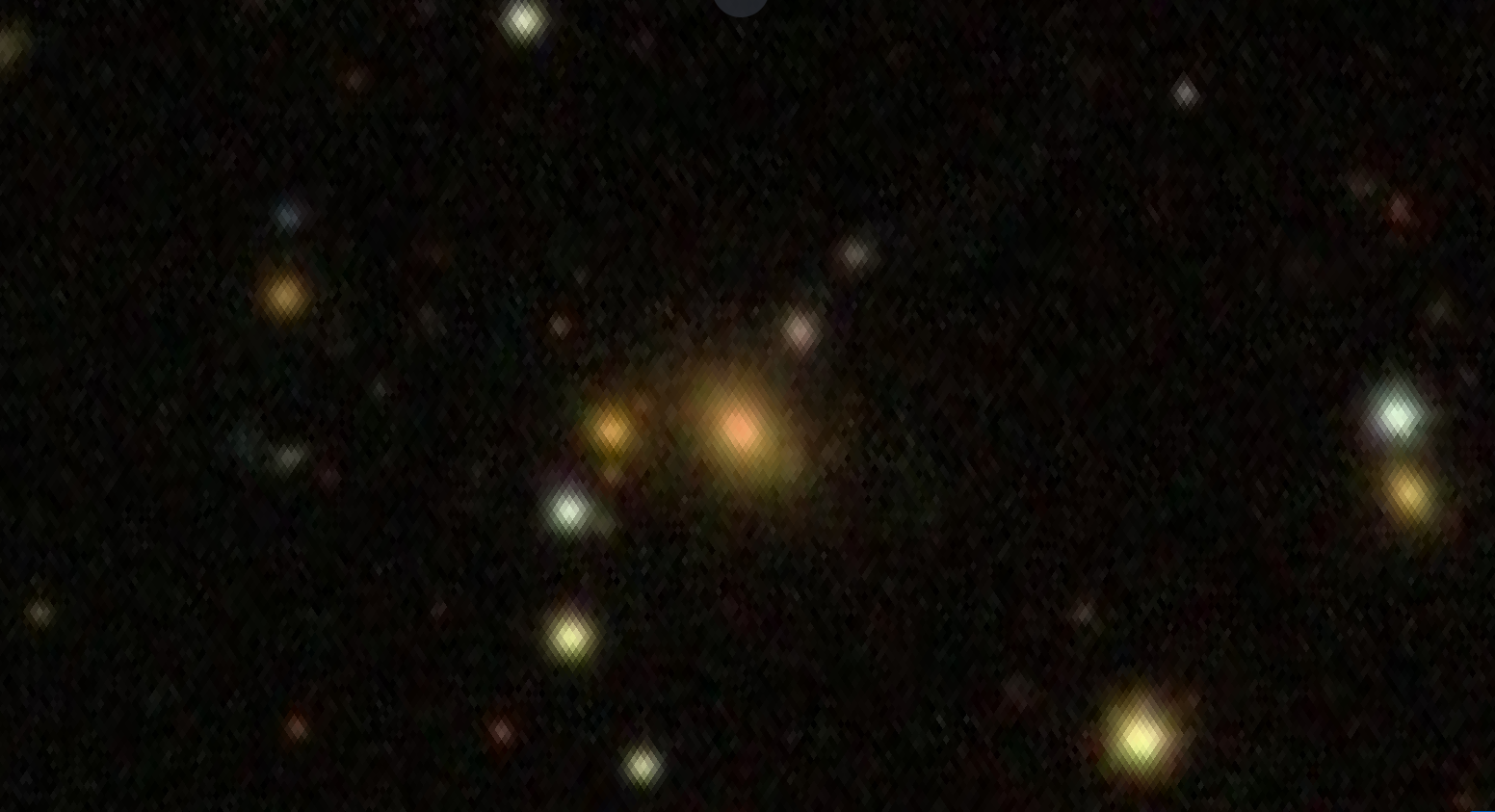
- Sloan Digital Sky Survey image of radio galaxy B3 0309+411B.

Observation data (J2000.0 epoch)
- Constellation: Perseus
- Right ascension: 03^{h} 13^{m} 01.96^{s}
- Declination: +41° 20′ 01.18″
- Redshift: 0.134000
- Heliocentric radial velocity: 40,172 km/s
- Distance: 1.632 Gly
- Apparent magnitude (B): 18.0

Characteristics
- Type: Radio galaxy Sy1
- Size: ~212,000 ly (65.01 kpc) (estimated)

Other designations
- 2MASX J03130194+4120012, LEDA 3096766, NVSS J031301+412002, 22W 003, OCARS 0309+411, TXS 0309+411, 0309+411, 2MASS J03130196+4120012

B3 0309+411B is a radio galaxy located in the constellation of Perseus. It has a redshift of (z) 0.134 and it was first discovered by astronomers in 1989 who classified it as an 18 magnitude galaxy with a quasar spectrum. It displays broad emission lines making it a broad-line radio galaxy (BLRG) and is located on the outskirts of the Perseus Cluster.

== Description ==
B3 0309+411B is classified as a giant radio galaxy with angular size of 1.8 megaparsecs. When imaged, it is dominated by a central radio core, straddled by two radio lobes which are extended by 9.5 arcseconds. Very Large Array (VLA) and Very Long Baseline Interferometry (VLBI) also found there is a weak jet-like extension. Imaging by Giant Metrewave Radio Telescope revealed the galaxy has a radio jet which curves and extends by 250 kiloparsecs before bending in an abrupt way, reaching a northern hotspot region. New imaging at 43 GHz by Very Long Baseline Array (VLBA) revealed a straight jet instead, aligning with a brighter kiloparsec-jet.

The core of B3 0309+411B is found strongly variable at wavelengths and has an inverted radio spectrum. The asymmetry of the core is likely influenced through relativistic motion. It has an extension towards northwest direction of a blob feature 25 located arcseconds away according to VLA and MERLIN observations. Evidence also confirmed the core component might be variable in polarization given the polarization percentage recorded at 1600 MHz is 0.655 ± 0.6 at the position angle of 13 ± 2°.

Observations with Westerbork Synthesis Radio Telescope in 1979, located an additional component in B3 0309+411B. This component appears resolved and is located 87 arcseconds away from the compact component. Further evidence also showed it is extended and has a flat spectral index between 178 MHz and 1.4 GHz. It is suggested the source might belong to a D2 classification; sources that are depicted with a flat spectrum component and coincident with an optical object.
