= Simon Ratcliffe (astronomer) =

South African astronomer

- Born: Simon
- Citizenship: South Africa
- Occupation: astronomer

Simon Ratcliffe is a South African astronomer known for his promotion of the Square Kilometre Array project. The media have dubbed him the "barefoot astronomer" for his habit of working without shoes.
