= Five-hundred-meter Aperture Spherical Telescope =

Radio telescope in Guizhou, China

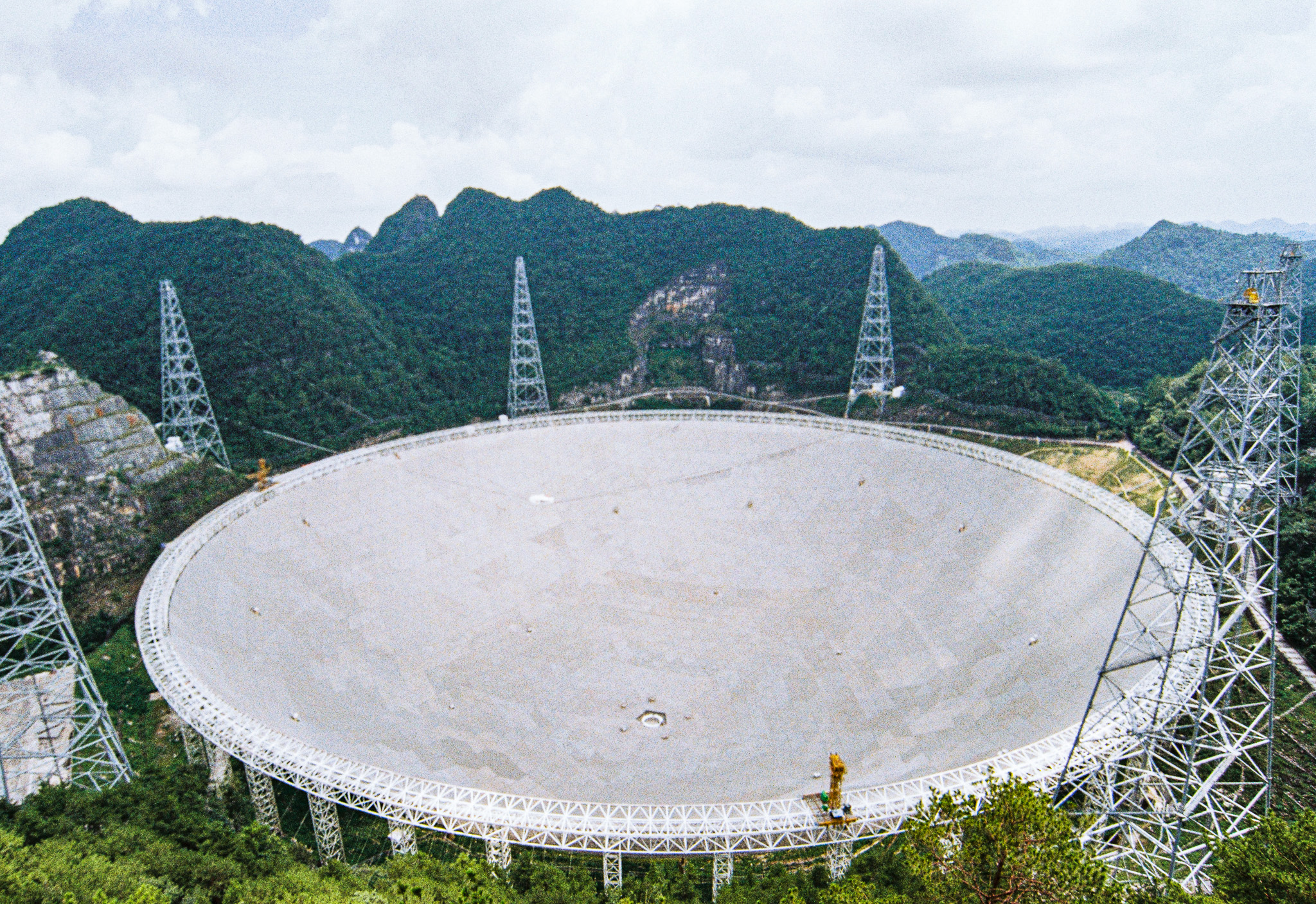
- The telescope as seen from above in 2025
- Alternative names: Tianyan
- Location: Jinke Village, Kedu, Pingtang County, Qiannan Buyei and Miao Autonomous Prefecture, Guizhou, PRC
- Coordinates: 25°39′11″N 106°51′24″E
- Wavelength: 0.10 m (3.0 GHz)–4.3 m (70 MHz)
- First light: 3 July 2016
- Diameter: 500 m (1,640 ft 5 in)
- Illuminated diameter: 300 m (984 ft 3 in)
- Collecting area: 196,000 m^{2} (2,110,000 sq ft)
- Illuminated area: 70,690 m^{2} (760,900 sq ft)
- Focal length: 140 m (459 ft 4 in)
- Website: fast.bao.ac.cn
- Location within China
- Related media on Commons

The Five-hundred-meter Aperture Spherical Telescope (FAST; Chinese: 五百米口径球面射电望远镜), nicknamed Tianyan (天眼, lit. "Sky's/Heaven's Eye"), is a radio telescope located in the Dawodang depression (大窝凼洼地), a natural basin in Pingtang County, Guizhou, southwestern China. FAST has a 500 m (1,640 ft) diameter dish constructed in a natural depression in the landscape. It is the world's largest single-dish telescope.

It has a novel design, using an active surface made of 4,500 metal panels which form a moving parabola shape in real time. The cabin containing the feed antenna, suspended on cables above the dish, can move automatically by using winches to steer the instrument to receive signals from different directions. It observes at wavelengths of 10 cm to 4.3 m.

Construction of FAST began in 2011. It observed first light in September 2016. After three years of testing and commissioning, it was declared fully operational on 11 January 2020.

The telescope made its first discovery, of two new pulsars, in August 2017. The new pulsars PSR J1859-01 and PSR J1931-02—also referred to as FAST pulsar #1 and #2 (FP1 and FP2), were detected on 22 and 25 August 2017; they are 16,000 and 4,100 light years away, respectively. Parkes Observatory in Australia independently confirmed the discoveries on 10 September 2017. By September 2018, FAST had discovered 44 new pulsars, and by 2021, 500. The total exceeded 1,000 by November 2024. According to the National Astronomical Observatories of the Chinese Academy of Sciences, this is more than the combined number of pulsars discovered by all other telescopes over the same period.

== History ==
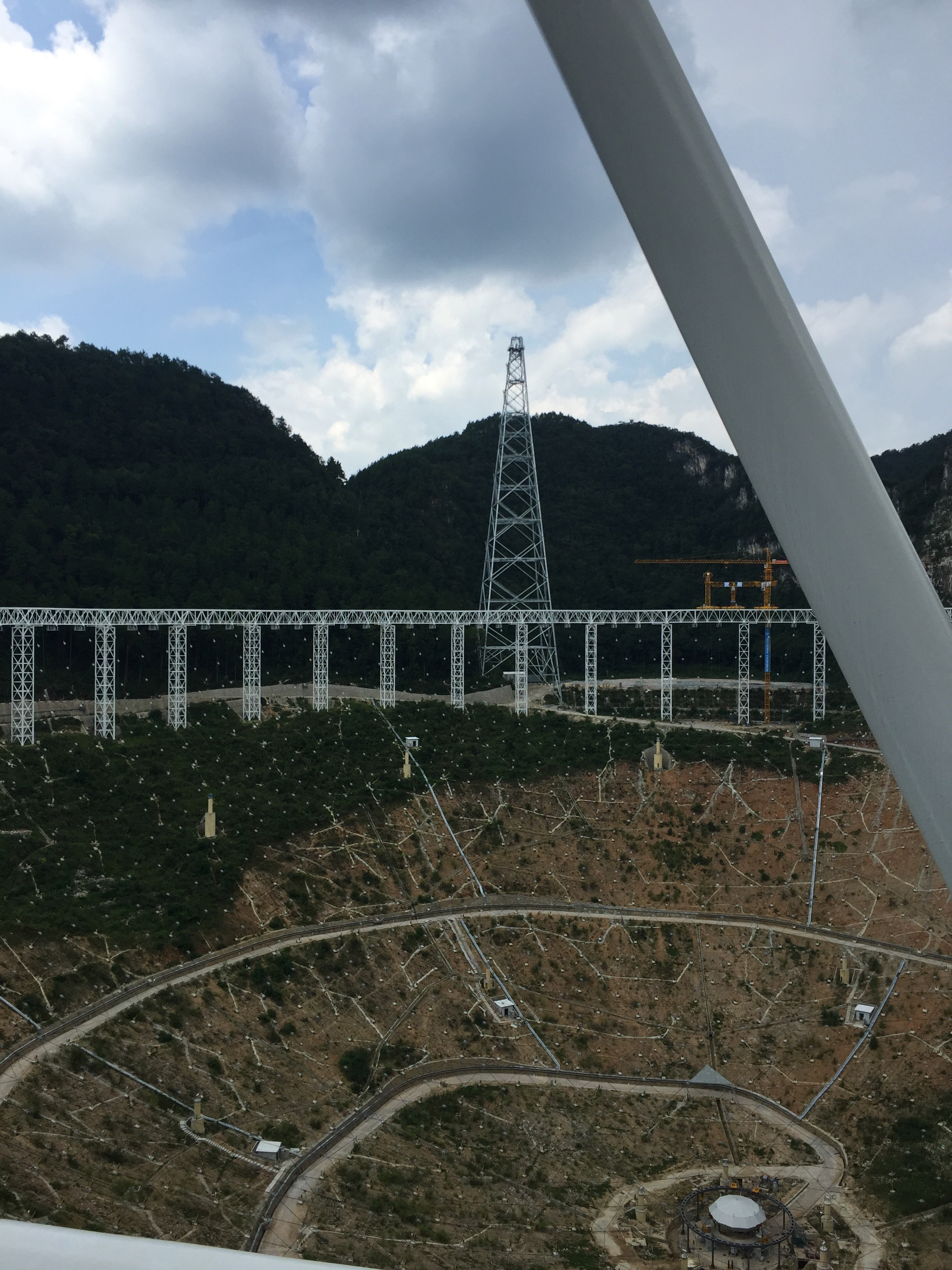
FAST under construction

The telescope was first proposed in 1994. The project was approved by the National Development and Reform Commission (NDRC) in July 2007. A 65-person village was relocated from the valley to make room for the telescope and an additional 9,110 people living within a 5 km (3 mi) radius of the telescope were relocated to create a radio-quiet area. The Chinese government spent around US$269 million in poverty relief funds and bank loans for the relocation of the local residents, while the construction of the telescope itself cost $180 million.

On 26 December 2008, a foundation-laying ceremony was held on the construction site. Construction started in March 2011, and the last panel was installed on the morning of 3 July 2016.

Originally budgeted for CN¥700 million, the final cost was CN¥1.2 billion (US$180 million). Significant difficulties encountered were the site's remote location and poor road access, and the need to add shielding to suppress radio-frequency interference (RFI) from the primary mirror actuators. The actuators were redesigned to meet shielding efficiency requirements and their installation was completed in 2015. Interference from the actuators has not been detected since.

Testing and commissioning began with first light on 25 September 2016. The first observations were done without the active primary reflector, which was configured in a fixed shape to use the Earth's rotation to scan the sky. Subsequent early science took place mainly in lower frequencies while the active surface is brought to its design accuracy; longer wavelengths are less sensitive to errors in reflector shape. It took three years to calibrate the various instruments so it can become fully operational.

Local government efforts to develop a tourist industry around the telescope are causing some concern among astronomers worried about nearby mobile telephones acting as sources of RFI. A projected 10 million tourists in 2017 will force officials to decide on the scientific mission versus the economic benefits of tourism.

The primary driving force behind the project was Nan Rendong, a researcher with the Chinese National Astronomical Observatory, part of the Chinese Academy of Sciences. He held the positions of chief scientist and chief engineer of the project. He died on 15 September 2017 in Boston due to lung cancer.

On 14 June 2022, astronomers, working with China's FAST telescope, reported the possibility of having detected artificial (presumably alien) signals, but cautioned that further studies are required to determine if some kind of natural radio interference may be the source. More recently, on 18 June 2022, Dan Werthimer, chief scientist for several SETI-related projects, noted, "These signals are from radio interference; they are due to radio pollution from earthlings, not from E.T."

== Overview ==
FAST has a reflecting surface 500 metres (1,600 ft) in diameter located in a natural sinkhole in the karst rock landscape, focusing radio waves on a receiving antenna in a "feed cabin" suspended 140 m (460 ft) above it. The reflector is made of perforated aluminium panels supported by a mesh of steel cables hanging from the rim.

FAST's surface is made of 4,450 triangular panels, 11 m (36 ft) on a side, in the form of a geodesic dome. There are 2,225 winches located underneath that make it an active surface, pulling on joints between panels, deforming the flexible steel cable support into a parabolic antenna aligned with the desired sky direction.

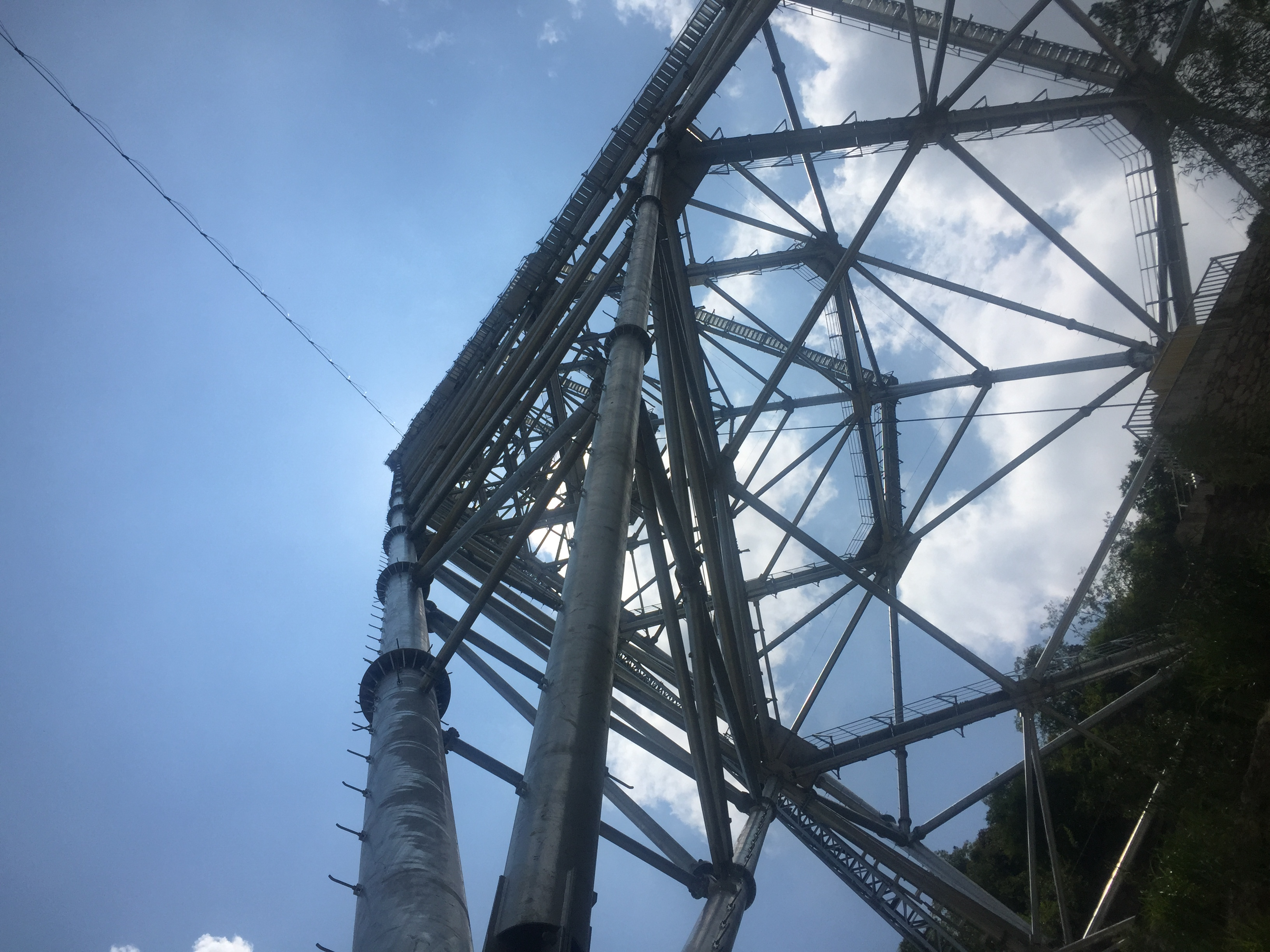
One of six support towers for the feed cabin

Above the reflector is a lightweight feed cabin moved by a cable robot using winch servomechanisms on six support towers. The receiving antennas are mounted below this on a Stewart platform which provides fine position control and compensates for disturbances like wind motion. This produces a planned pointing precision of 8 arcseconds.

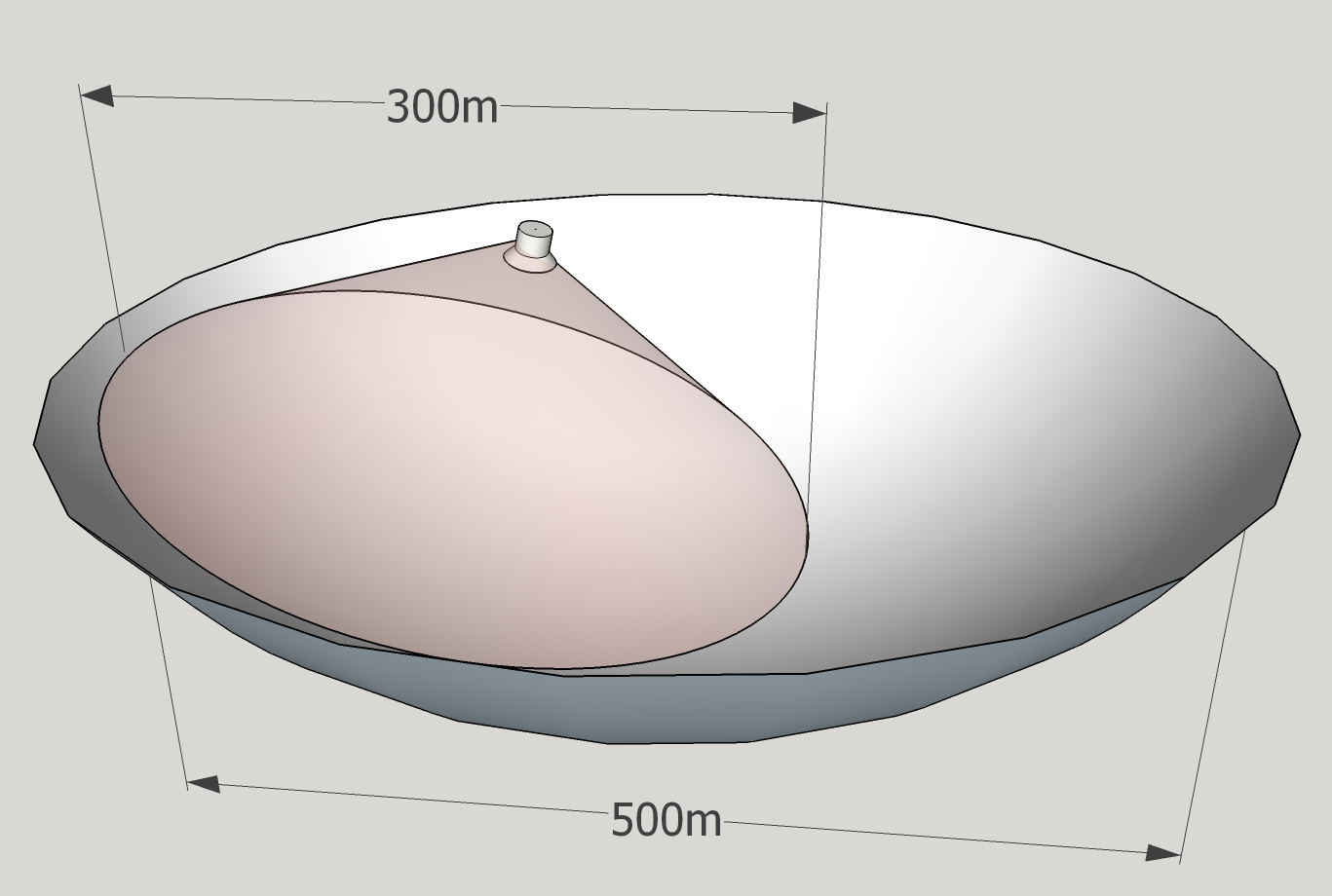
300 m illuminated aperture within 500 m dish

The maximum zenith angle is 40 degrees when the effective illuminated aperture is reduced to 200 m, while it is 26.4 degrees when the effective illuminated aperture is 300 m without loss.

Although the reflector diameter is 500 m (1,600 ft), held in the correct parabolic shape and "illuminated" by the receiver, only a circle of 300 m diameter is useful at any one time. The telescope can be pointed to different positions on the sky by illuminating a 300-meter section of the 500 meter aperture. (FAST has a smaller effective aperture than the Jicamarca Radio Observatory, which has a filled aperture of equivalent diameter of 338 m).

Its working frequency ranges from 70 MHz to 3.0 GHz, with the upper limit set by the precision with which the primary can approximate a parabola. It could be improved slightly, but the size of the triangular segments limits the shortest wavelength which can be received. The original plan was to cover the frequency range with 9 receivers. During the construction phase, a commissioning ultra-wide band receiver covering 260 MHz to 1620 MHz was proposed and built, which produced the first pulsar discovery from FAST. At the moment, only the FAST L-band Receiver-array of 19 beams (FLAN) is installed and is operational between 1.05 GHz and 1.45 GHz.

The Next Generation Archive System (NGAS), developed by the International Centre for Radio Astronomy Research (ICRAR) in Perth, Australia and the European Southern Observatory will store and maintain the large amount of data that it collects.

A five-kilometer zone near the telescope forbids tourists from using mobile phones and other radio-emitting devices.

Work is underway on building an additional 24 radio dishes, each with a diameter of 40 metres (130 ft), forming a radio-telescope array with a 10 kilometres (6.2 mi) diameter. The project should boost telescope resolution by 30 times.

== Science mission ==
The FAST website lists the following science objectives of the radio telescope:

1. Large scale neutral hydrogen survey
2. Pulsar observations
3. Leading the international very long baseline interferometry (VLBI) network
4. Detection of interstellar molecules
5. Detecting interstellar communication signals (Search for extraterrestrial intelligence)
6. Pulsar timing arrays

The FAST telescope joined the Breakthrough Listen SETI project in October 2016 to search for intelligent extraterrestrial communications in the Universe.

In February 2020, scientists announced the first SETI observations with the telescope.

China's Global Times reported that its 500-meter (1,600 foot) FAST telescope will be open to the global scientific community starting in April 2021 (when applications will be reviewed), and becoming effective in August 2021. Foreign scientists will be able to submit applications to China's National Astronomical Observatories online.

== Comparison with Arecibo telescope ==
Comparison of the Arecibo (top), FAST (middle) and RATAN-600 (bottom) radio telescopes at the same scale

The basic design of FAST is similar to the former Arecibo Telescope. Both designs had reflectors installed in natural hollows within karst limestone, made of perforated aluminium panels with a movable receiver suspended above; and both have an effective aperture smaller than the physical size of the primary. There are however significant differences in addition to the size.

First, Arecibo's dish was fixed in a spherical shape. Although it was also suspended from steel cables with supports underneath for fine-tuning the shape, they were manually operated and adjusted only during maintenance. It had a fixed spherical shape with two additional suspended reflectors in a Gregorian configuration to correct for spherical aberration.

Second, Arecibo's receiver platform was fixed in place. To support the greater weight of the additional reflectors, the primary support cables were static, with the only motorised portion being three hold-down winches which compensated for thermal expansion. The antennas could move along a rotating arm below the platform, to allow limited adjustment of azimuth, although Arecibo was not limited in azimuth, only in zenith angle: The smaller range of motion limited it to viewing objects within 19.7° of the zenith.

Third, Arecibo could receive higher frequencies. The finite size of the triangular panels making up FAST's primary reflector limits the accuracy with which it can approximate a parabola, and thus the shortest wavelength it can focus. Arecibo's more rigid design allowed it to maintain sharp focus down to 3 cm wavelength (10 GHz); FAST is limited to 10 cm (3 GHz). Improvements in position control of the secondary might be able to push that to 6 cm (5 GHz), but then the primary reflector becomes a hard limit.

Fourth, the FAST dish is significantly deeper, contributing to a wider field of view. Although 64% larger in diameter, FAST's radius of curvature is 300 m (980 ft), barely larger than Arecibo's 270 m (870 ft), so it forms a 113° arc (vs. 70° for Arecibo). Although Arecibo's full aperture of 305 m (1,000 ft) could be used when observing objects at the zenith, this was only possible with the line feed which had a very narrow frequency range and had been unavailable due to damage since 2017. Most Arecibo observations used the Gregorian feeds, where the effective aperture was approximately 221 m (725 ft) at zenith.

Fifth, Arecibo's larger secondary platform also housed several transmitters, making it one of the few instruments in the world capable of radar astronomy. (Planetary radar is also possible at the Jicamarca and Millstone and Altair observatories.) The NASA-funded Planetary Radar System allowed Arecibo to study solid objects from Mercury to Saturn, and to perform very accurate orbit determination on near-Earth objects, particularly potentially hazardous objects. Arecibo also included several NSF funded radars for ionospheric studies (ionosondes). Such powerful transmitters are too large and heavy for FAST's small receiver cabin, so it will not be able to participate in planetary defense although in principle it could serve as a receiver in a bistatic radar system. (Arecibo has been used in several multi-static experiments with an auxiliary 100 meter dish, including S-band radar experiments in the stratosphere, and ISAR mapping of Venus.)

== See also ==
- Chinese space program
- KARST – a 1990s Chinese proposal to host the SKA
- List of telescope types
- Square Kilometre Array – a proposed 1 km^{2} telescope array in Australia and South Africa
