= EMBRACE (telescope) =

Prototype radio telescope

- Location: France, Netherlands
- Coordinates: 47°22′55″N 2°11′58″E
- Website: satorchi.net/skads/embrace64.php
- Location within France

EMBRACE (Electronic MultiBeam Radio Astronomy ConcEpt) is a prototype radio telescope for phase two of the Square Kilometre Array (SKA) project. It's the first dense phased array for radioastronomy in the GHz frequency range (initially planned for covering the 0.5-1.5 GHz, mid-frequency band of SKA). It is composed of two sites, one at the Nançay radio telescope station in France, and one near the Westerbork Synthesis Radio Telescope antennas in Netherlands.
