= Karst (surname) =

Karst as a surname may refer to one of the following persons.

- Friedrich Karst (1893–1975), German highly decorated Generalleutnant in the Wehrmacht
- Gene Karst (1906–2004), American, first dedicated publicist in the history of MLB
- John Karst (1893–1976) American professional baseball player
- Kenneth L. Karst (1929–2019), American legal scholar
- Michael Karst (born 1952), German track and field athlete
- Raymond W. Karst (1908–1987), an American former member of the United States House of Representatives

== See also ==
- P.Karst, a standard abbreviation for Petter Adolf Karsten
