= Gene Karst =

Eugene F. Karst (June 25, 1906 – April 6, 2004) is recognized as the first dedicated publicist in the history of Major League Baseball (MLB). He was hired in 1931 by Branch Rickey, then the General Manager of the St. Louis Cardinals, to write features about the Cardinals for small-town newspapers that could not afford to cover the team in person. To do this, Karst set up MLB's first press office. In this post, he wrote stories, created promotions, and made players available for interviews and guest appearances. He spent four years in this position with the Cardinals before moving on to join the Cincinnati Reds in the same capacity.

While with the Reds, Karst played a major role in baseball history by creating as a promotion MLB's first night game. The game was played on May 24, 1935, with the Cincinnati Reds defeating the Philadelphia Phillies 2-1 at Cincinnati's Crosley Field.

In 2001, Karst was inducted into the St. Louis Media Hall of Fame. He died on April 6, 2004, at age 97 in Ladue, Missouri.
