= KARST =

Chinese proposal for a large radio telescope

In the early days of planning of the international Square Kilometre Array (SKA) during the 1990s, the Chinese delegation vied to host the SKA, proposing to build several large dishes in the natural limestone depressions (karsts) that dimple its southwestern provinces, and called the proposal Kilometer-square Area Radio Synthesis Telescope (KARST).

Chinese astronomers even did preliminary work on the FAST radiotelescope as a prototype.

The countries hosting the SKA Telescope became South Africa and Australia. KARST would have consisted of about 30 individual elements, each about 200 meters in diameter. A site survey of 288 suitable locations was performed in Pingtang County, Guizhou Province.

== Location ==
Suitable sites for the SKA telescope must be in unpopulated areas with guaranteed very low levels of human-made radio interference. Four sites were initially proposed: in South Africa, Australia, Argentina and China. After considerable site evaluation surveys, Argentina and China were dropped and the other two sites were shortlisted. On 25 May 2012 it was announced that the SKA will be split over the South African and African sites and the Australia and New Zealand sites.

== See also ==
- List of radio telescopes
