= Square Kilometre Array =

International radio telescope project

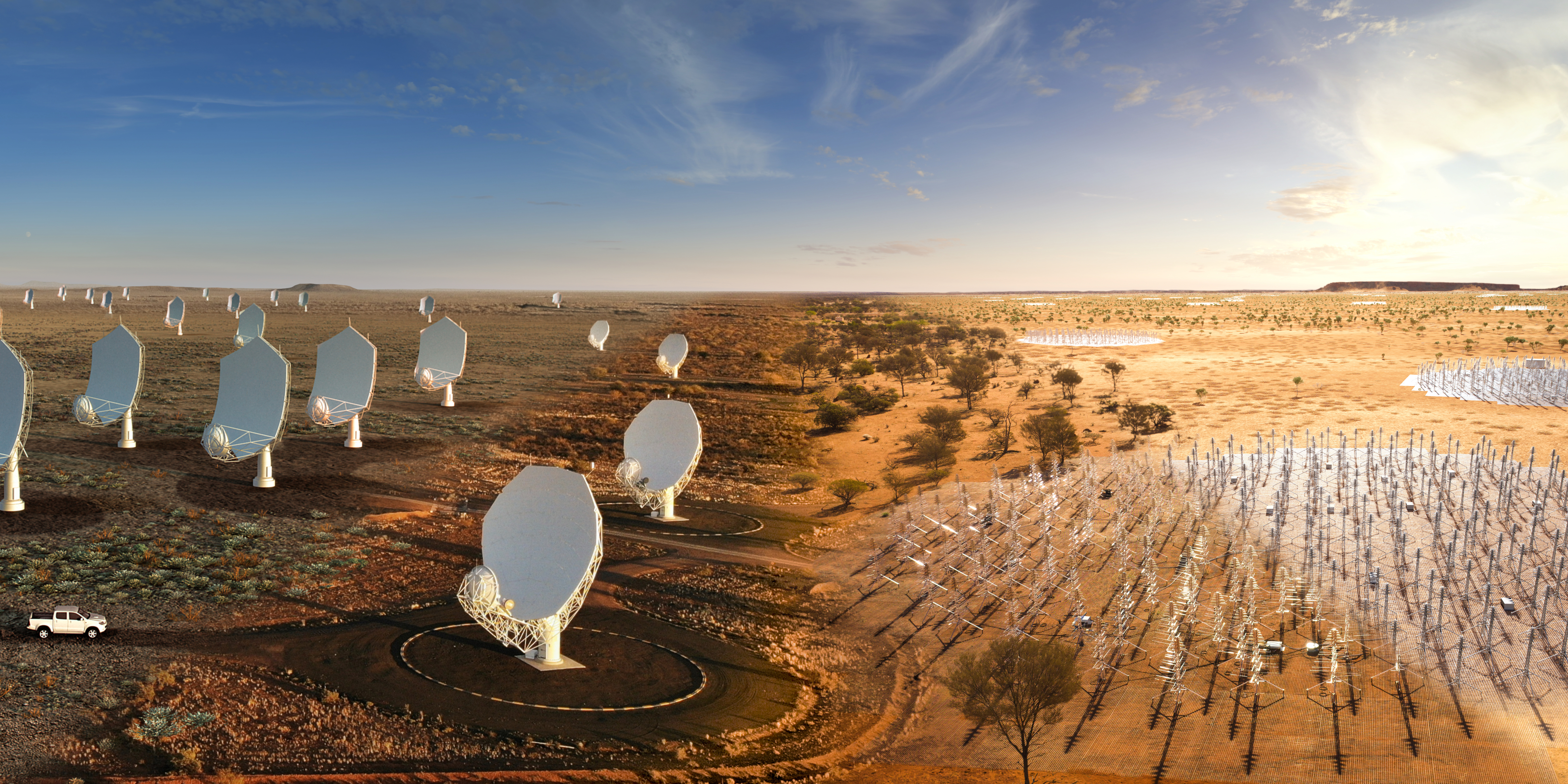
- Artist's impression
- Alternative names: SKA
- Location: Meerkat National Park, South Africa and Murchison Radio-astronomy Observatory, Australia
- Coordinates: 30°43′16″S 21°24′40″E and 26°49′27″S 116°45′52″E
- Built: 2018–
- First light: 2027 (projected)
- Collecting area: 1 km^{2} (11,000,000 sq ft)
- Website: www.skao.int
- Location within South Africa
- Related media on Commons

Square Kilometre Array (SKA) is an intergovernmental international radio telescope project being built in Australia (low-frequency) and South Africa (mid-frequency). The combining infrastructure, the Square Kilometre Array Observatory (SKAO), and headquarters, are located at the Jodrell Bank Observatory in the United Kingdom. The SKA cores are being built in the Southern Hemisphere, where the view of the Milky Way galaxy is the best and radio interference is at its least.

The name refers to the notional size of the telescope's collecting area, not to the extent of the entire telescope array, which is far larger. Conceived in the 1990s, and further developed and designed by the late-2010s, the intention is that when completed it will have a total collecting area of approximately one square kilometre as originally conceived. The design of the first phase of SKA, scheduled as of 2025 for science operation in 2032, consists of 21,000 square metres (0.021 km^{2}) of collecting area of dishes. It will operate over a wide range of frequencies and its size will make it 50 times more sensitive than any other radio instrument. If built as planned, it should be able to survey the sky more than ten thousand times faster than before. With receiving stations extending out to a distance of at least 3,000 km (1,900 mi) from a concentrated central core, it will exploit radio astronomy's ability to provide the highest-resolution images in all astronomy.

The SKAO consortium was founded in Rome in March 2019 by seven initial member countries, with several others subsequently joining; as of 2021 there were 14 members of the consortium. This international organisation is tasked with building and operating the facility. The project has two phases of construction: the current SKA1, commonly just called SKA, and a possible later significantly enlarged phase sometimes called SKA2. The construction phase of the project began on 5 December 2022 in both South Africa and Australia.

== History ==
The Square Kilometre Array (SKA) was originally conceived in 1991 with an international working group set up in 1993. This led to the signing of the first Memorandum of Agreement in 2000.

In the early days of planning, China vied to host the SKA, proposing to build several large dishes in the natural limestone depressions (karst) that dimple its southwestern provinces; China called their proposal Kilometer-square Area Radio Synthesis Telescope (KARST).

Australia's first radio quiet zone was established by the Australian Communications & Media Authority on 11 April 2005 specifically to protect and maintain the current "radio-quietness" of the main Australian SKA site at the Murchison Radio-astronomy Observatory.

The project has two phases of construction: the current SKA1, commonly just called SKA, and a possible later significantly enlarged phase sometimes called SKA2. PrepSKA commenced in 2008, leading to a full SKA design in 2012. Construction of the SKA telescopes will take 8 years, beginning in July of 2021, with the first antennas for the SKA-Low array being placed in 2024 and the first SKA-Mid receiver being placed in 2025.

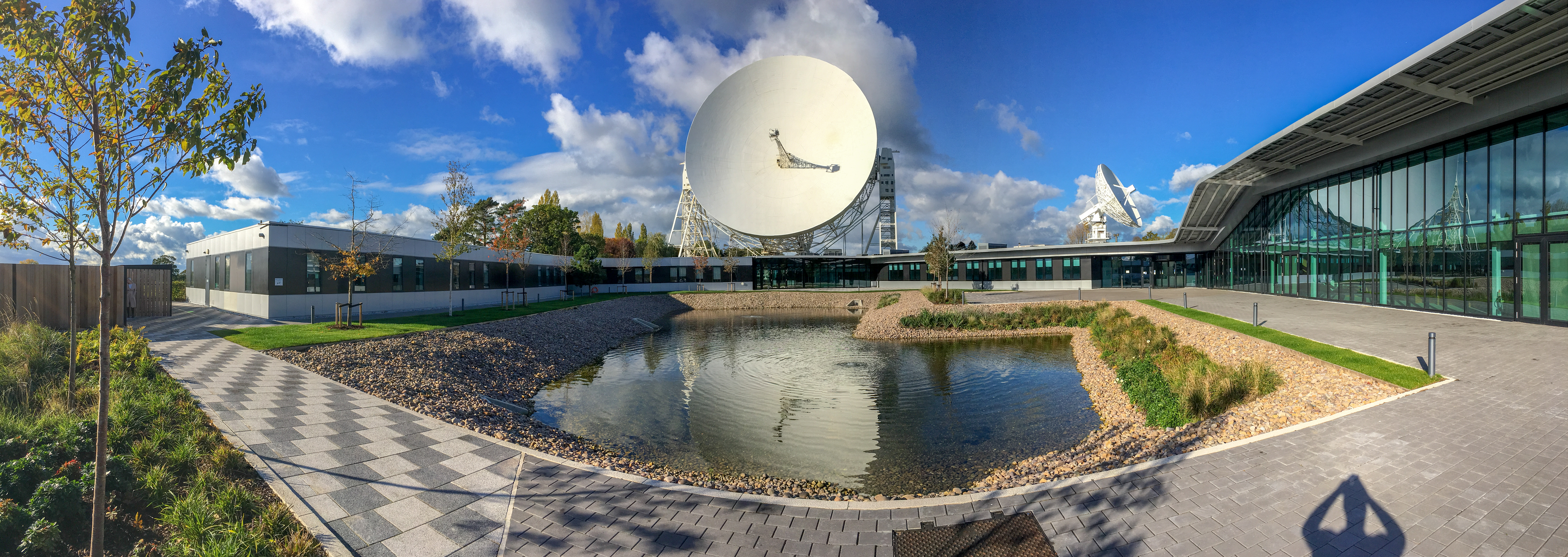
The SKA headquarters at Jodrell Bank, with the Lovell Telescope in the background

In April 2011, Jodrell Bank Observatory of the University of Manchester, in Cheshire, England was announced as the location for the project headquarters. In November 2011, the SKA Organisation was formed as an intergovernmental organisation and the project moved from a collaboration to an independent, not for profit, company.

In February 2012, a former Australian SKA Committee chairman raised concerns with South African media about risks at the Australian candidate site, particularly in terms of cost, mining interference and land agreements. SKA Australia stated that all points had been addressed in the site bid. In March 2012 it was reported that the SKA Site Advisory Committee had made a confidential report in February that the South African bid was stronger. However a scientific working group was set up to explore possible implementation options of the two candidate host regions, and on 25 May 2012 it was announced that it had been determined that the SKA would be split over the South African and African sites, and the Australia and New Zealand sites. While New Zealand remained a member of the SKA Organisation in 2014, it appeared that no SKA infrastructure was likely to be located in New Zealand.

In April 2015, the headquarters of the SKA project were chosen to be located at the Jodrell Bank Observatory in England, officially opened in July 2019.

Initial construction contracts began in 2018. Scientific observations with the fully completed array are not expected any earlier than 2027.

On 12 March 2019, the Square Kilometre Array Observatory (SKAO) was founded in Rome by seven initial member countries: Australia, China, Italy, the Netherlands, Portugal, South Africa and the United Kingdom. India and Sweden are expected to follow shortly, and eight other countries have expressed interest to join in the future. This international organisation was tasked with building and operating the facility, with the first construction contracts expected to be awarded in late 2020.

By mid-2019, the start of scientific observations were expected to start no earlier than 2027. In July 2019, New Zealand withdrew from the project.

As of November 2020, five precursor facilities were already operating: MeerKAT and the Hydrogen Epoch of Reionization Array (HERA) in South Africa, the Australian SKA Pathfinder (ASKAP) and Murchison Widefield Array (MWA) in Western Australia and the International LOFAR Telescope, spread across Europe with a core in the Netherlands.

The construction phase of the project began on 5 December 2022 in Australia and South Africa, with delegations from each of the eight countries leading the project attending ceremonies to celebrate the event. The Australian part of the project comprises 100,000 antennas built across 74 km (46 mi), also in the Murchison region, in the traditional lands of the Wajarri Aboriginal people. Bulldozers were expected to start working on the site in early 2023, with the completion date estimated as 2028. The site has been named Inyarrimanha Ilgari Bundara, which means 'sharing sky and stars' in the Wajarri language.

The Department of Atomic Energy (DAE) in India and UK Research and Innovation (UKRI) are investigating the possibility of establishing supercomputing facilities to handle data from the Square Kilometre Array radio telescope. The UK and India are part of the team developing the computational processing for the SKA radio telescope. On 3 January 2024, Indian government approved joining the SKA project accompanied by a financial commitment of ₹1,250 crore which marks the initial step towards ratification as a member state.

== Description ==
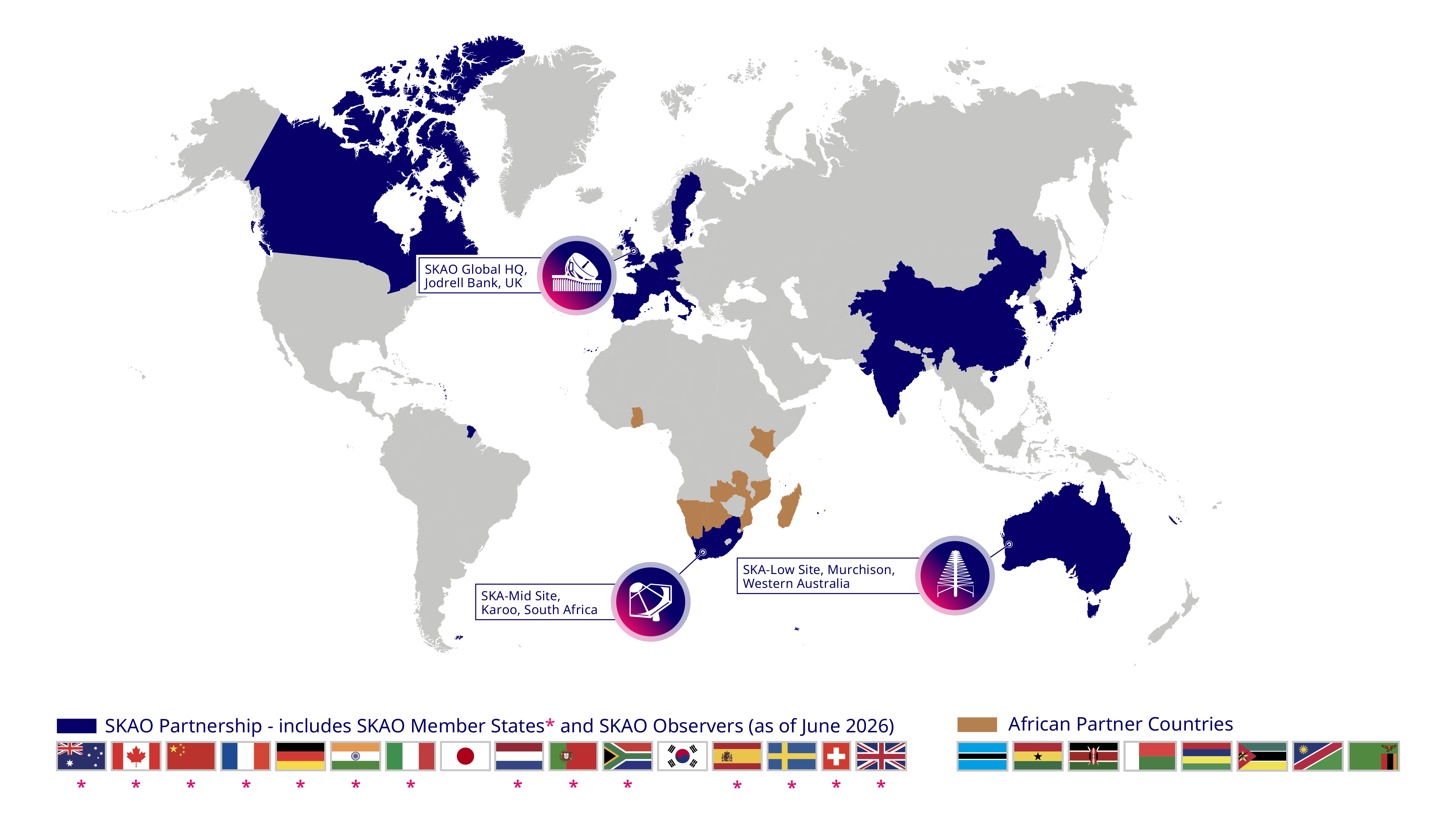
Square Kilometre Array Organisation (SKAO) membership map

Each of the two parts of the SKA (SKA-low in Australia and SKA-mid in Africa) will combine the signals received from thousands of small antennas spread over a distance of up to 150 km to simulate a single giant radio telescope capable of extremely high sensitivity and angular resolution, using a technique called aperture synthesis. In addition, each of the two parts of the SKA will link to other radio telescopes located up to thousands of km away, using the technique of Very-long-baseline interferometry, to provide extremely high resolution. Some of the sub-arrays of the SKA will also have a very large field-of-view (FOV), making it possible to survey very large areas of sky at once. This will greatly increase the survey speed of the SKA and enable several users to observe different pieces of the sky simultaneously, which is useful for (e.g.) monitoring multiple pulsars. The combination of a very large FOV with high sensitivity means that the SKA will be able to compile extremely large surveys of the sky considerably faster than any other telescope.

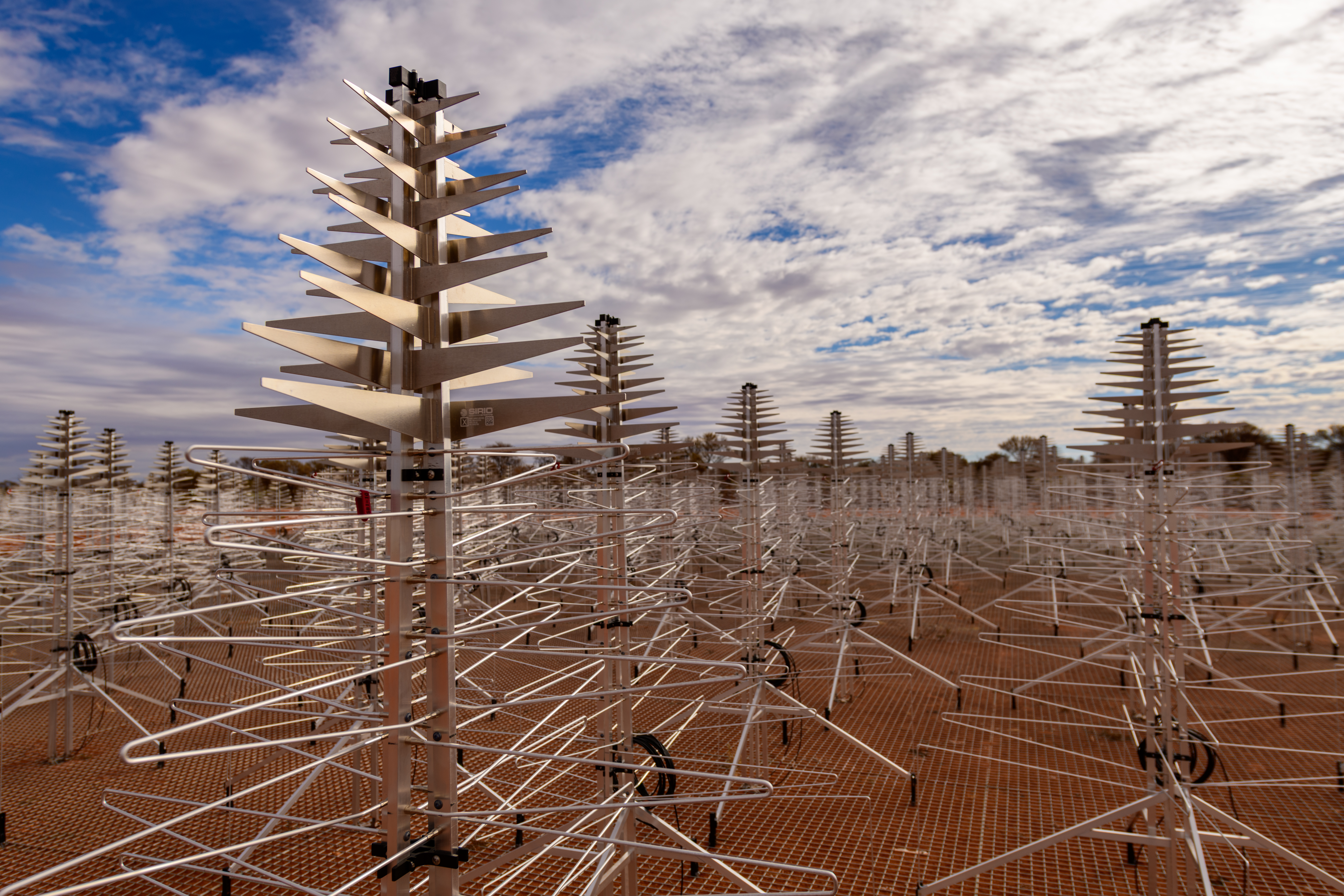
SKA-Low antenna station

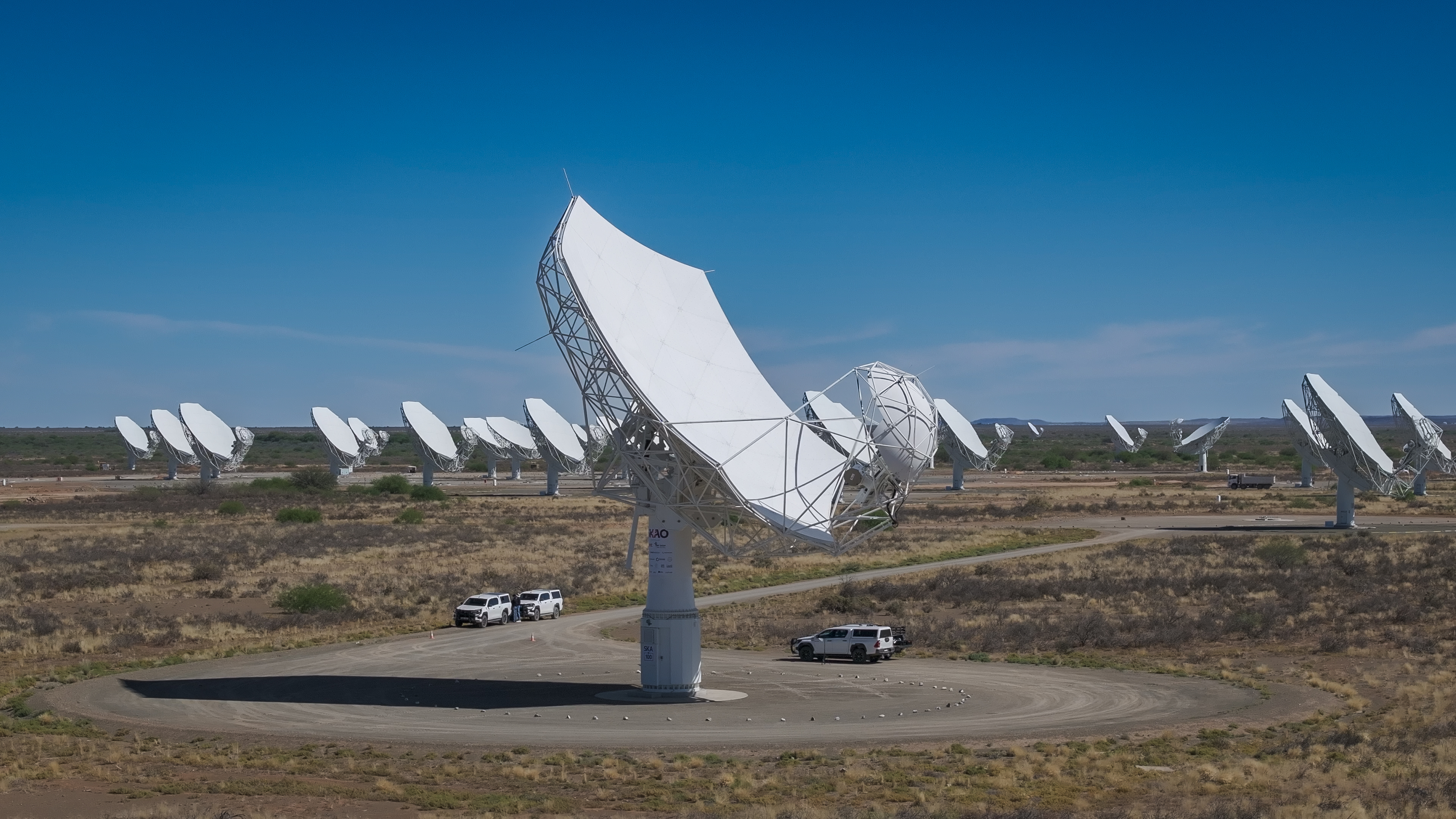
An SKA-Mid dish with MeerKAT dishes in the background

The two sub-arrays of the SKA are:

1. SKA-low array: a phased array of low-frequency "Chistmas-tree" antennas to cover the frequency range from 50 to 350 MHz. These will be grouped in 40 m diameter stations each containing 256 vertically oriented dual-polarisation dipole elements. Stations will be arranged with 75% located within a 2 km diameter core and the remaining stations situated on three spiral arms, extending out to a radius of 50 km. SKA-low produced its first image using just 1,000 of the planned 131,000 antennas in March 2025, but completion is not expected until about 2030.
2. SKA-mid array: an array of several thousand dish antennas (around 200 to be built in Phase 1) to cover the frequency range 350 MHz to 14 GHz. It is expected that the antenna design will follow that of the Allen Telescope Array using an offset Gregorian design having a height of 15 metres and a width of 12 metres.

Early designs also called for an SKA-survey array: a compact array of parabolic dishes of 12–15 meters diameter each for the medium-frequency range, each equipped with a multi-beam, phased array feed with a large field of view and several receiving systems covering about 350 MHz – 4 GHz. The survey sub-array was removed from the SKA1 specification following a "rebaselining" exercise in 2015.

The area covered by the SKA – extending out to ~3000 km – will comprise three regions:

1. A central region containing about 5 km diameter cores of SKA-mid antennas (South Africa) and SKA-low dipoles (Western Australia). These central regions will contain approximately half of the total collecting area of the SKA arrays.
2. A mid region extending out to 180 km. This will contain dishes and pairs of SKA-mid and SKA-low stations. In each case they will be randomly placed within the area with the density of dishes and stations falling off towards the outer part of the region.
3. An outer region from 180 km to 3000 km. This will comprise five spiral arms, along which dishes of SKA-mid, grouped into stations of 20 dishes, will be located. The separation of the stations increases towards the outer ends of the spiral arms.

=== Costs ===
The SKA was estimated to cost €1.8 billion in 2014, including €650 million for Phase 1, which represented about 10% of the planned capability of the entire telescope array. There have been numerous delays and rising costs over the nearly 30-year history of the intergovernmental project.

As of December 2022, the whole project was reported to be worth around A$3 billion.

=== Members ===
As of June 2026, the members of the SKAO consortium were:

- Founding members:
  - Australia: Department of Industry and Science
  - China: National Remote Sensing Centre of the Ministry of Science and Technology of the People's Republic of China (中华人民共和国科学技术部 - Zhōnghuá Rénmín Gònghéguó Kēxué Jìshùbù)
  - Italy: National Institute for Astrophysics (Istituto Nazionale di Astrofisica)
  - Portugal: Portugal Space Agency (Agência Espacial Portuguesa)
  - South Africa: South African Radio Astronomy Observatory of the National Research Foundation
  - The Netherlands: ASTRON - Netherlands Institute for Radio Astronomy ( (ASTRON - Astronomisch Onderzoek in Nederland)
  - United Kingdom: Science and Technology Facilities Council
- Joined in 2022:
  - Switzerland: SKACH Consortium
- Joined in 2023:
  - Spain: Institute of Astrophysics of Andalusia (Instituto de Astrofísica de Andalucía)
- Joined in 2024:
  - Canada: Radio Astronomy Directorate of the National Research Council
  - Germany: Association for Data-Intensive Radio Astronomy (Verein für datenintensive Radioastronomie e.V.)
  - India: National Centre for Radio Astrophysics (राष्ट्रीय रेडियो खगोल भौतिकी केन्द्र - Raashtreey Radio Khagol Bhautikee Kendra)
- Joined in 2025:
  - Sweden: Onsala Space Observatory - Chalmers University of Technology (Onsala rymdobservatorium - Chalmers tekniska högskola)
- Joined in 2026:
  - France: National Centre for Scientific Research (Centre National de la Recherche Scientifique)
- Observers:
  - Japan: National Astronomical Observatory (国立天文台 - Kokuritsu Tenmondai)
  - South Korea: Korea Astronomy and Space Science Institute (한국천문연구원 - Hangugcheonmun-Yeonguwon)
- African Partners, involved in coordinated action to support the future expansion of the SKA project in Africa:
  - Botswana
  - Ghana
  - Kenya
  - Madagascar
  - Mauritius
  - Mozambique
  - Namibia
  - Zambia

== SKA locations ==
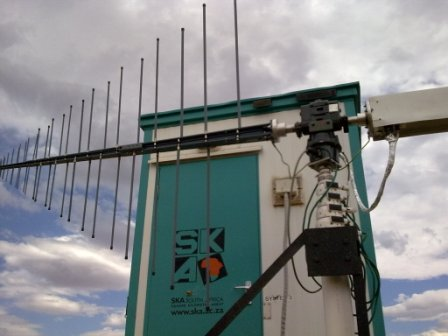
An automatic wideband radio scanner system was used to survey the radio frequency noise levels at the various candidate sites in South Africa.

The headquarters of the SKA are located at the University of Manchester's Jodrell Bank Observatory in Cheshire, England, while the telescopes are being constructed in Australia and South Africa.

Suitable sites for the SKA telescope must be in unpopulated areas with guaranteed very low levels of man-made radio interference. Four sites were initially proposed in South Africa, Australia, Argentina and China. After considerable site evaluation surveys, Argentina and China were dropped and the other two sites were shortlisted (with New Zealand joining the Australian bid, and 8 other African countries joining the South African bid):

=== Australia ===
The core site is located at the Murchison Radio-astronomy Observatory (MRO) near Boolardy in the state of Western Australia, 315 km (196 mi) north-east of Geraldton

=== South Africa ===
The core site is located at the Meerkat National Park, at an elevation of about 1000 metres, in the Karoo area of the arid Northern Cape Province. There are also distant stations in Botswana, Ghana, Kenya, Madagascar, Mauritius, Mozambique, Namibia and Zambia.

== Precursors, pathfinders and design studies ==
Many groups are working globally to develop the technology and techniques required for the SKA. Their contributions to the international SKA project are classified as either: Precursors, Pathfinders or Design Studies.

- Precursor facility: A telescope on one of the two SKA candidate sites, carrying out SKA-related activity.
- Pathfinder: A telescope or programme carrying out SKA-related technology, science and operations activity.
- Design Study: A study of one or more major sub-systems of the SKA design, including the construction of prototypes

=== Precursor facilities ===
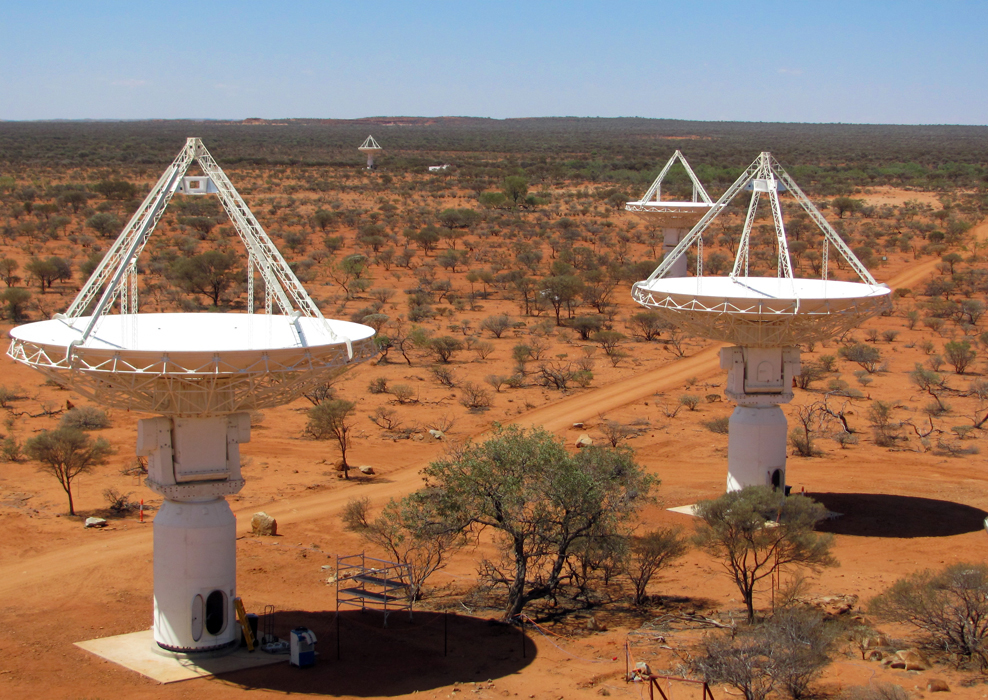
CSIRO's ASKAP antennas at the MRO in Western Australia

==== Australian SKA Pathfinder (ASKAP) ====
The Australian SKA Pathfinder, or ASKAP, is an A$100 million project which built a telescope array of thirty-six, twelve-metre dishes. It employs advanced, innovative technologies such as phased array feeds to give a wide field of view (30 square degrees). ASKAP was built by CSIRO at the Murchison Radio-astronomy Observatory site, located near Boolardy in the mid-west region of Western Australia. All 36 antennas and their technical systems were officially opened in October 2012.

==== MeerKAT ====
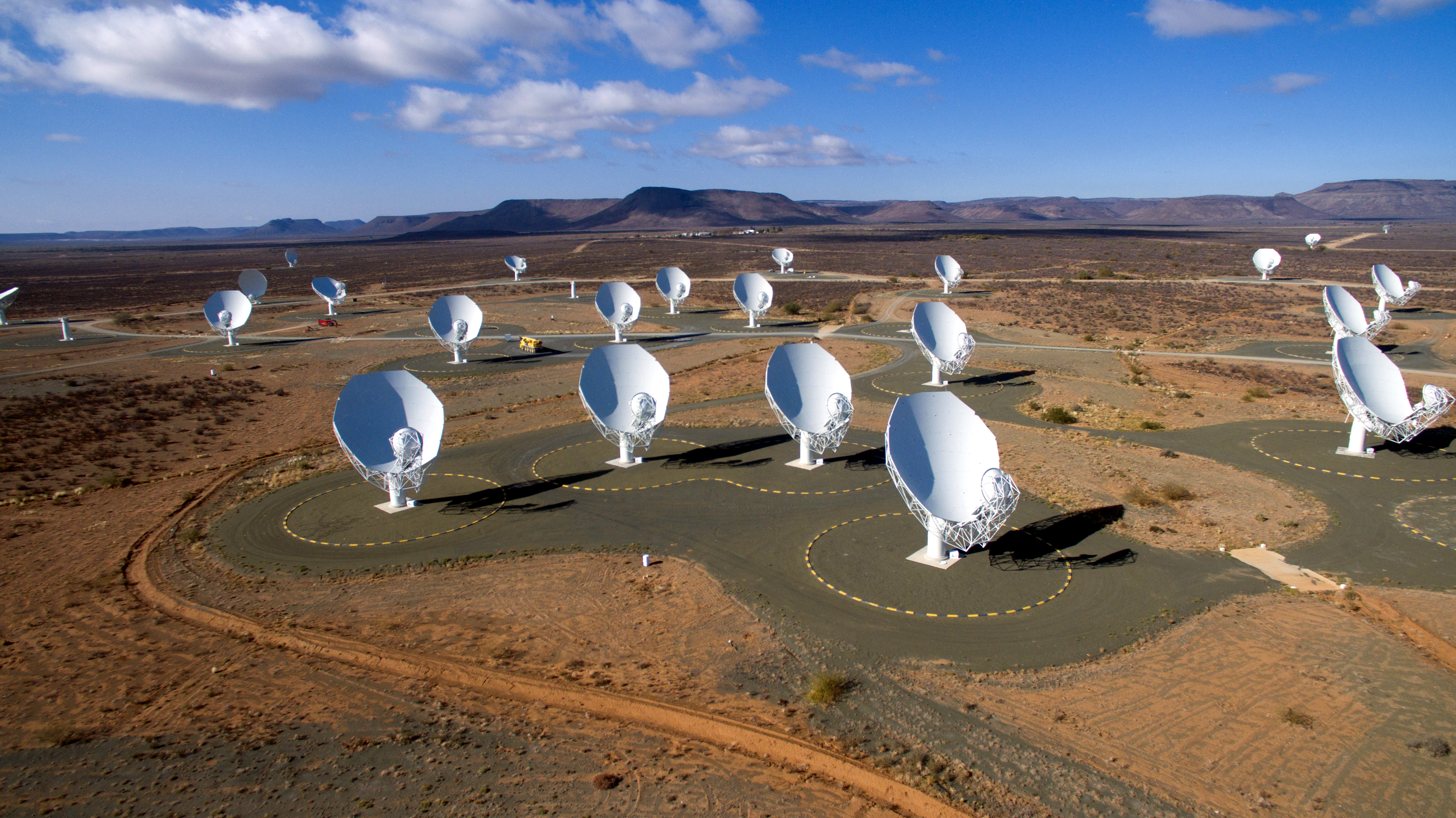
MeerKAT telescopes in the Meerkat National Park in the Karoo

MeerKAT is a South African project consisting of an array of sixty-four 13.5-metre diameter dishes as a world class science instrument, and was also built to help develop technology for the SKA.

KAT-7, a seven-dish engineering and science testbed instrument for MeerKAT, in the Meerkat National Park near Carnarvon in the Northern Cape Province of South Africa was commissioned in 2012 and was up and running by May 2018 when all sixty-four 13.5-metre diameter (44.3 feet) dish antennae were completed, with verification tests then underway to ensure the instruments are functioning correctly. The dishes are equipped with a number of high performance single pixel feeds to cover frequencies from 580 MHz up to 14 GHz.

==== Murchison Widefield Array (MWA) ====
The Murchison Widefield Array is a low-frequency radio array operating in the frequency range 80–300 MHz that began upgraded operation in 2018 at the Murchison Radio-astronomy Observatory site in Western Australia.

==== Hydrogen Epoch of Reionization Array (HERA) ====
The HERA array is located in South Africa's Meerkat National Park. It is designed to study highly redshifted atomic hydrogen emission emitted prior to, and during the epoch of reionization.

=== Pathfinders ===
- APERture Tile in Focus (Apertif)
- Very Long Baseline Interferometry
- Electronic MultiBeam Radio Astronomy ConcEpt
- e-MERLIN
- Expanded Very Large Array
- Long Wavelength Array
- SKA Molonglo Prototype (SKAMP)
- NenuFAR
- Giant Metrewave Radio Telescope

==== Allen Telescope Array ====
The Allen Telescope Array in California uses innovative 6.1m offset Gregorian dishes equipped with wide band single feeds covering frequencies from 500 MHz to 11 GHz. The 42-element array in operation by 2017 is to be extended to 350 elements. The dish design has explored methods of low-cost manufacture.

==== LOFAR ====
The International LOFAR Telescope—a €150 million Dutch-led project—is a novel low-frequency phased aperture array spread over northern Europe. An all-electronic telescope covering low frequencies from 10 to 240 MHz, it came online from 2009 to 2011. LOFAR was in 2017 developing crucial processing techniques for the SKA.. Because of its baselines of up to 2000 km, it can make images with sub-arcsecond angular resolution over a wide field of view. Such high-resolution imaging at low frequencies is unique and will be a factor of more than an order of magnitude better than SKA1-LOW.

=== Design studies ===
Data challenges of SKA pathfinders
Challenge	Specifications budgeted for ASKAP; Requirements for the SKA itself are about 100 times greater.
Large bandwidth from telescope to processor	~10 Tbit/s from antennas to correlator (< 6 km); 40 Gbit/s from correlator to processor (~ 600 km)
Large processing power	750 Tflop/s expected/budgeted 1 Pflop desired
Power consumption of processors	1 MW at site 10 MW for processor
Pipeline processing essential	including data validation, source extraction, cross-identification, etc.
Storage and duration of data	70 PB/yr if all products are kept 5 PB/yr with current funding 8 h to write 12 h of data to disk at 10 GB/s
Retrieval of data by users	all data in public domain accessed using VO tools & services
Data-intensive research	data mining, stacking, cross-correlation, etc.

- Aperture Array Verification Programme
- Canadian SKA Program
- Preparatory Study for the SKA
- Square Kilometre Array Design Studies (SKADS)
  - Electronic MultiBeam Radio Astronomy ConcEpt (EMBRACE)
  - BEST

==== Data challenges ====
The amount of sensory data collected poses a huge storage problem, and will require real-time signal processing to reduce the raw data to relevant derived information. In mid 2011 it was estimated the array could generate an exabyte a day of raw data, which could be compressed to around 10 petabytes. China, a founding member of the project, has designed and constructed the first prototype of the regional data processing centre. An Tao, head of the SKA group of the Shanghai Astronomical Observatory, stated, "It will generate data streams far beyond the total Internet traffic worldwide." The Tianhe-2 supercomputer was used in 2016 to train the software. The processing of the project will be performed on Chinese-designed and -manufactured Virtex-7 processors by Xilinx, integrated into platforms by the CSIRO. China has pushed for a unified beamforming design that has led other major countries to drop out of the project. Canada continues to use Altera Stratix-10 processors (by Intel). It is illegal for any US company to export high end Intel FPGAs or any related CSP design details or firmware to China amid the US-embargo which will severely limit cooperation.

==== Technology Development Project (TDP) ====
The Technology Development Project, or TDP, is a US$12 million project to specifically develop dish and feed technology for the SKA. It is operated by a consortium of universities and was completed in 2012.

== Project risks and opposition ==
Potential risks for priority astronomical sites in South Africa are protected by the Astronomy Geographic Advantage Act of 2007. Put in place to specifically support the South African SKA bid, it outlaws all activities that could endanger scientific operation of core astronomical instruments. In 2010, concerns were raised over the will to enforce this law when Royal Dutch Shell applied to explore the Karoo for shale gas using hydraulic fracturing, an activity that would have the potential to increase radio interference at the site.

An identified remote station location for the southern African array in Mozambique was subject to flooding and excluded from the project, despite the SKA Site Selection Committee technical analysis reporting that all African remote stations could implement flood mitigation solutions.

During 2014, South Africa experienced a month-long strike action by the National Union of Metalworkers (NUMSA), which added to the delays of the installation of dishes.

The largest risk to the overall project is probably its budget, which up until 2014 had not been committed.

There has been opposition to the project from farmers, businesses, and individuals in South Africa since the project's inception. The advocacy group called Save the Karoo has stated that the radio quiet zone would create further unemployment in the South African region where unemployment is already above 32%. Farmers had stated that the agriculture-based economy in the Karoo would collapse if they were forced to sell their land.

== Key projects ==
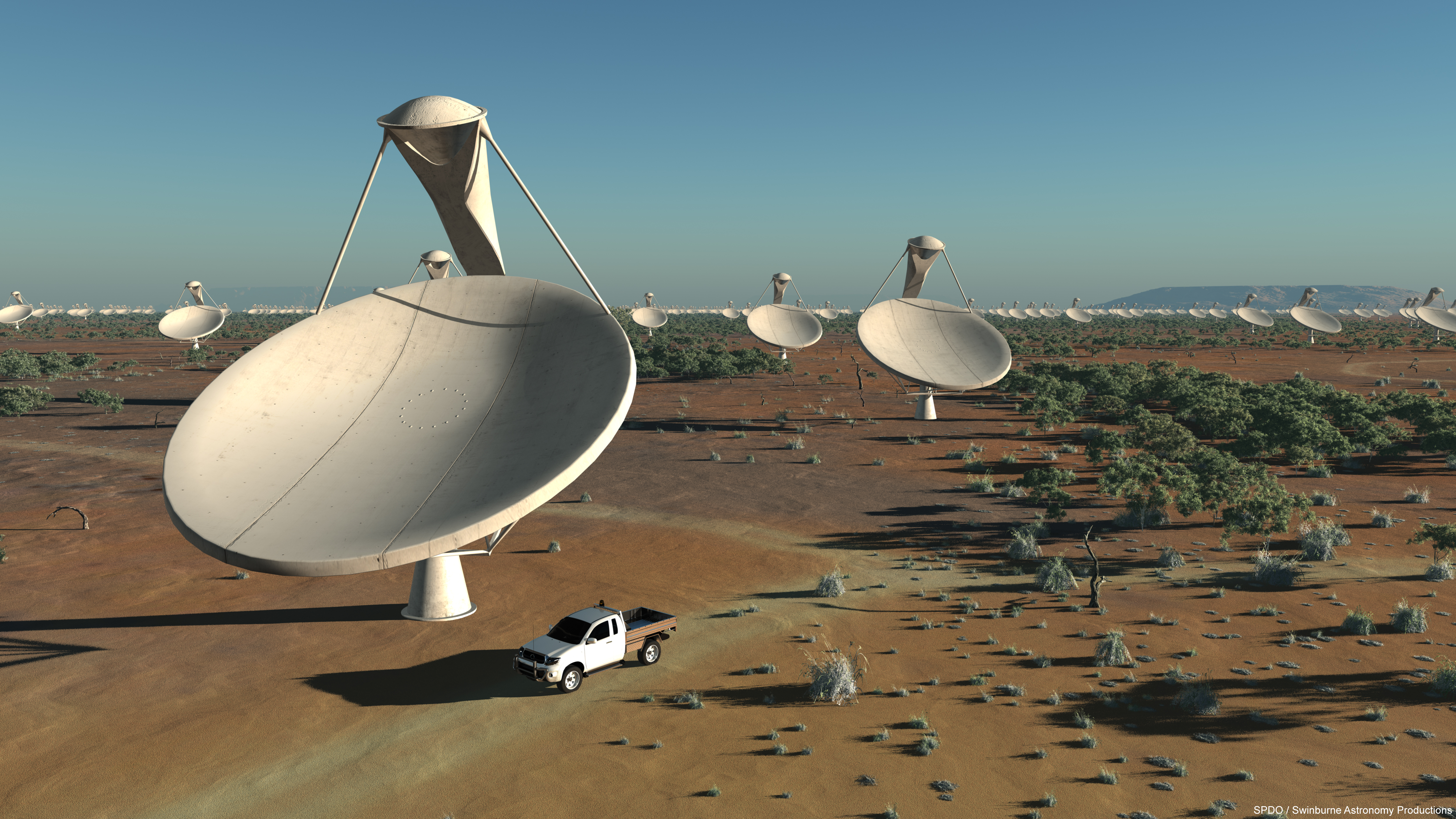
Artist's impression of the Offset Gregorian Antennas

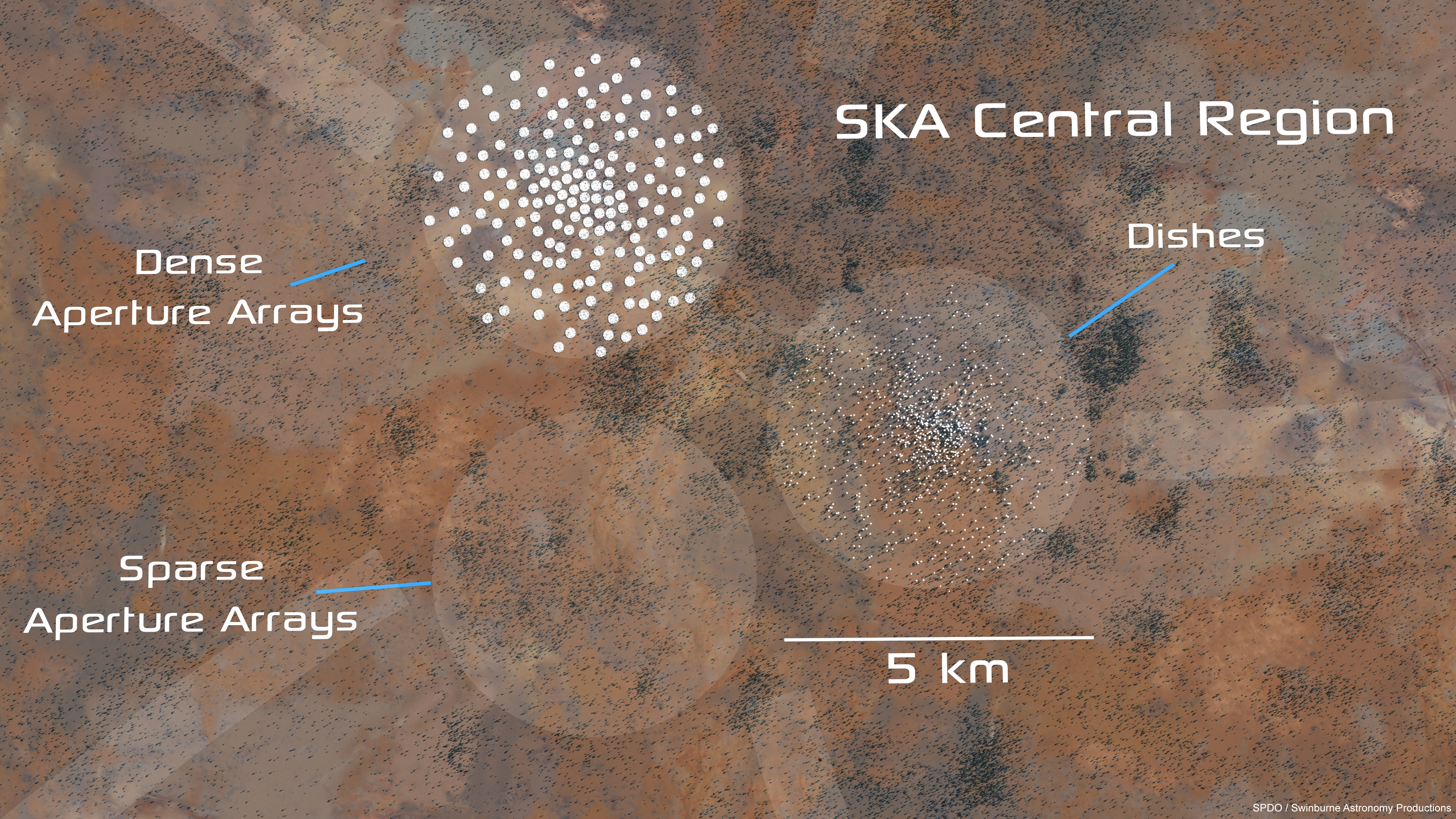
Schematic of the SKA Central Region

The capabilities of the SKA will be designed to address a wide range of questions in astrophysics, fundamental physics, cosmology and particle astrophysics as well as extending the range of the observable universe. A number of key science projects that have been selected for implementation via the SKA are listed below.

=== Extreme tests of general relativity ===
For almost one hundred years, Albert Einstein's general theory of relativity has precisely predicted the outcome of every experiment made to test it. Most of these tests, including the most stringent ones, have been carried out using radio astronomical measurements. By using pulsars as cosmic gravitational wave detectors, or timing pulsars found orbiting black holes, astronomers will be able to examine the limits of general relativity such as the behaviour of spacetime in regions of extremely curved space. The goal is to reveal whether Einstein was correct in his description of space, time and gravity, or whether alternatives to general relativity are needed to account for these phenomena.

=== Galaxies, cosmology, dark matter and dark energy ===
The sensitivity of the SKA in the 21 cm hydrogen line will map a billion galaxies out to the edge of the observable Universe. The large-scale structure of the cosmos thus revealed will give constraints to determine the processes resulting in galaxy formation and evolution. Imaging hydrogen throughout the Universe will provide a three-dimensional picture of the first ripples of structure that formed individual galaxies and clusters. This may also allow the measurement of effects hypothetically caused by dark energy and causing the increasing rate of expansion of the universe.

The cosmological measurements enabled by SKA galaxy surveys include testing models of dark energy, gravity, the primordial universe, and fundamental cosmology, and they are summarised in a series of papers available online.

=== Epoch of re-ionization ===
The SKA is intended to provide observational data from the so-called Dark Ages (between 300,000 years after the Big Bang when the universe became cool enough for hydrogen to become neutral and decouple from radiation) and the time of First Light (a billion years later when young galaxies are seen to form for the first time and hydrogen becomes ionized again). By observing the primordial distribution of gas, the SKA should be able to see how the Universe gradually lit up as its stars and galaxies formed and then evolved. This period of the Dark Ages, culminating in First Light, is considered the first chapter in the cosmic story of creation, and the resolving power required to see this event is the reason for the Square Kilometre Array's design. To see back to First Light requires a telescope 100 times more powerful than the biggest radio telescopes currently in the world, taking up 1 million square metres of collecting area, or one square kilometre.

=== Cosmic magnetism ===
It is still not possible to answer basic questions about the origin and evolution of cosmic magnetic fields, but it is clear that they are an important component of interstellar and intergalactic space. By mapping the effects of magnetism on the radiation from very distant galaxies, the SKA will investigate the form of cosmic magnetism and the role it has played in the evolving Universe.

=== Search for extraterrestrial life ===
This key science program, called "Cradle of Life", will focus on three objectives: observing protoplanetary discs in habitable zones, searching for prebiotic chemistry, and contributing to the search for extraterrestrial intelligence (SETI).

- The SKA will be able to probe the habitable zone of Sun-like protostars, where Earth-like planets or moons are most likely to have environments favourable for the development of life. The signatures of forming Earth-like planets imprinted on circumstellar dust may be the most conspicuous evidence of their presence and evolution, and may even detect planets capable of supporting life.
- Astrobiologists will also use the SKA to search for complex organic compounds (carbon-containing chemicals) in outer space, including amino acids, by identifying spectral lines at specific frequencies.
- The SKA will be capable of detecting extremely weak radio emission "leakage" from nearby extraterrestrial civilizations, if they exist.

== See also ==
- Five-hundred-meter Aperture Spherical Telescope
- KARST – a 1990s Chinese proposal to host the SKA
- List of radio telescopes
- LOFAR
- Mills Cross Telescope – related to the SKA development
- Simon Ratcliffe
- Project Cyclops
