= Westerbork Synthesis Radio Telescope =

Aperture synthesis interferometer in the Netherlands

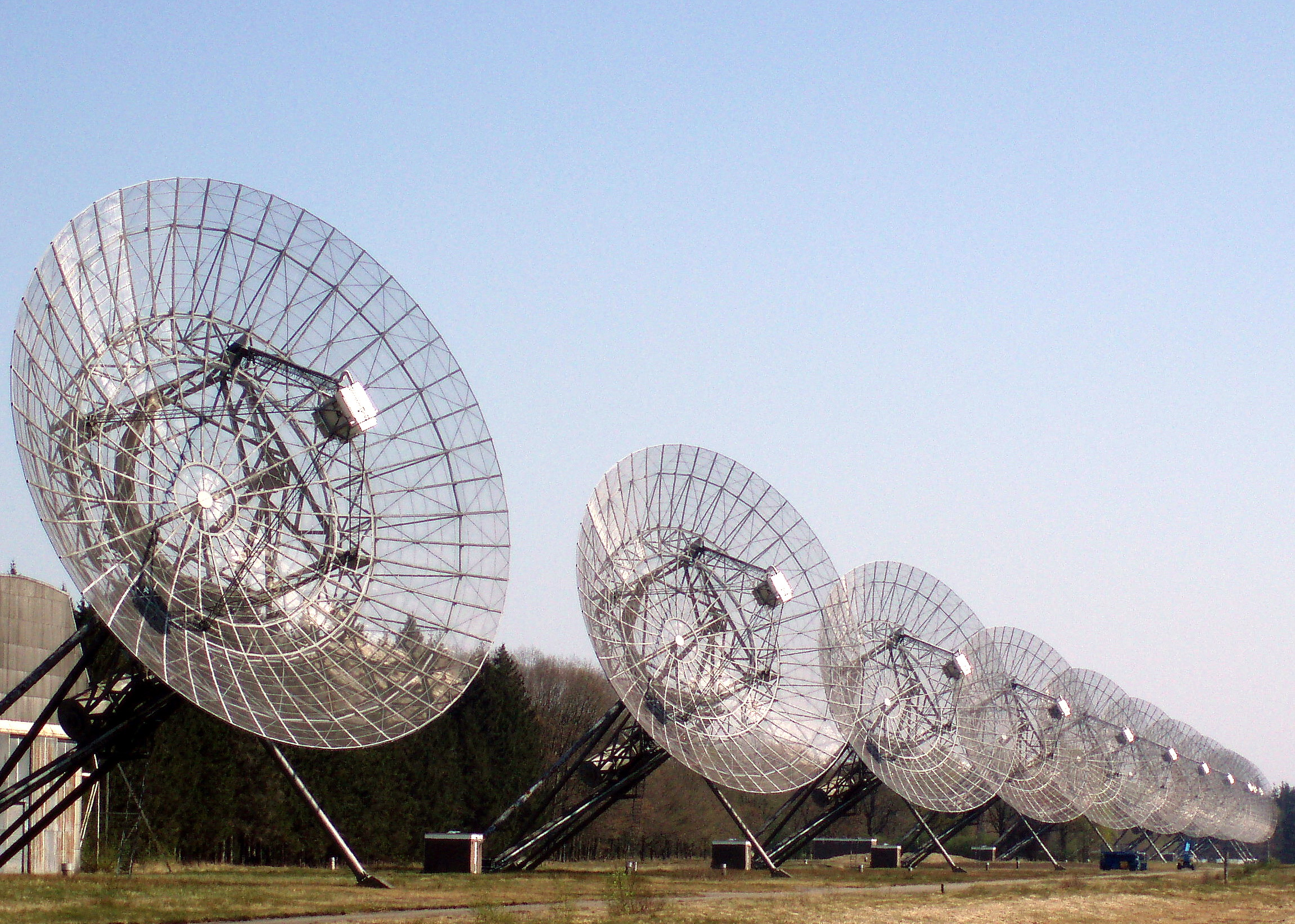
- Location: Hooghalen, Midden-Drenthe, Drenthe, Netherlands
- Coordinates: 52°54′53″N 6°36′12″E
- Location within Netherlands
- Related media on Commons

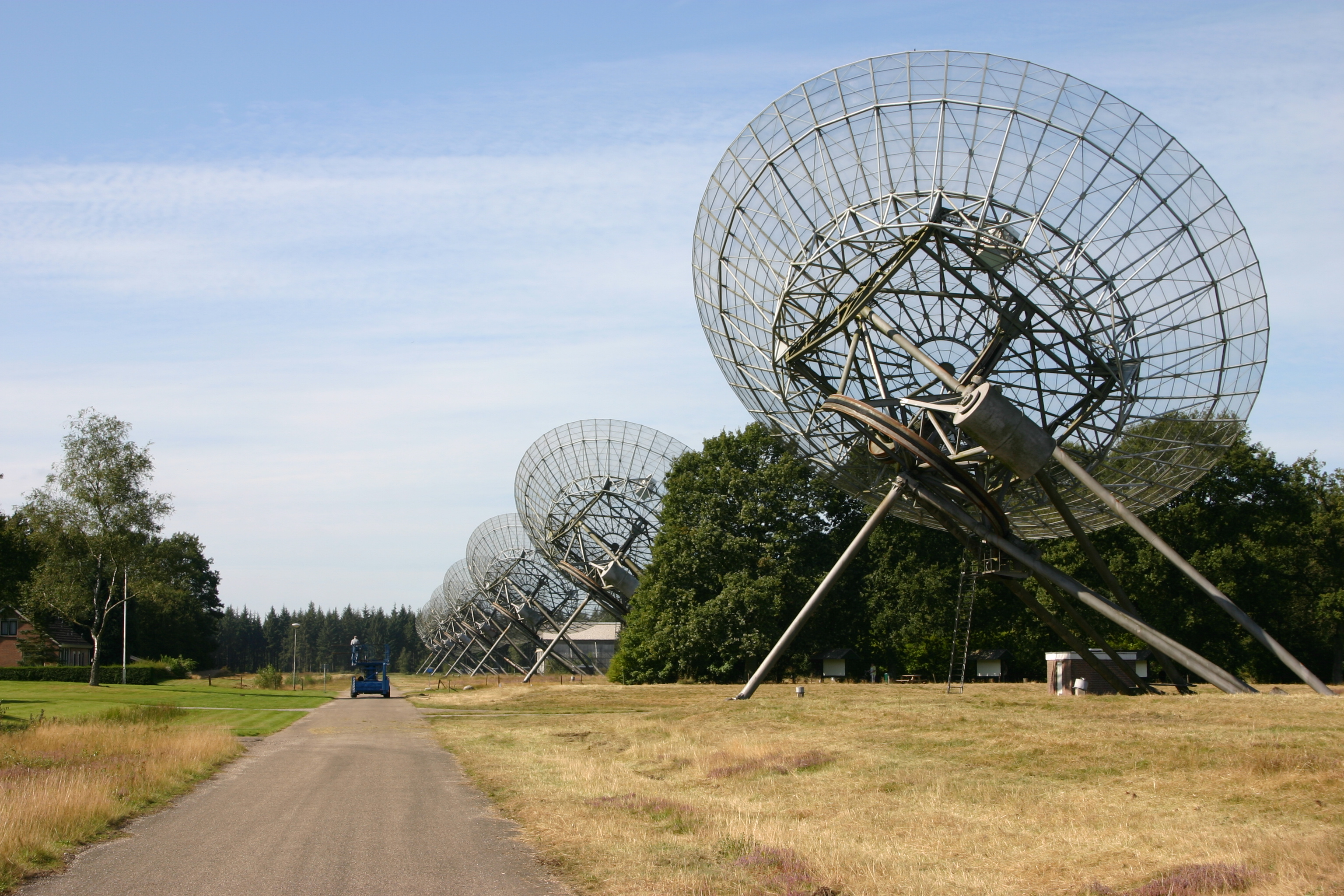
WSRT in operation in 2006

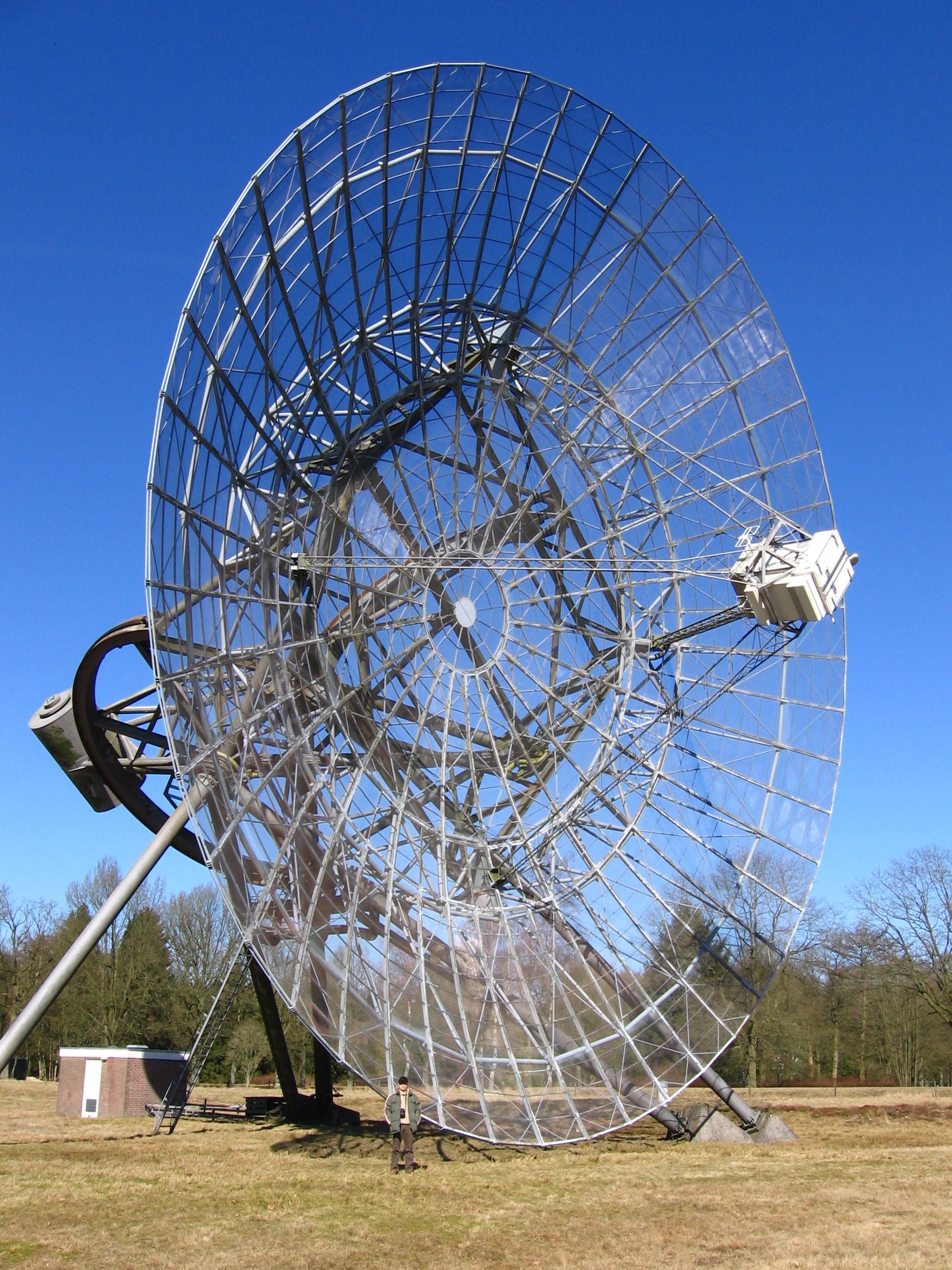
Single antenna in 2006

The Westerbork Synthesis Radio Telescope (WSRT) is an aperture synthesis interferometer built on the site of the former World War II Nazi detention and transit camp Westerbork, north of the village of Westerbork, Midden-Drenthe, in the northeastern Netherlands.

== Overview ==
The WSRT comprises fourteen 25 m (82 ft) radio telescopes deployed in a linear array arranged on a 2.7 km (1.7 mi) East-West line, of which 10 are in a fixed equidistant position, 2 are nearby on a 300 m (980 ft) rail track, and 2 are located 1 km (0.62 mi) eastwards on another 200 m (660 ft) rail track. It has a similar arrangement to other radio telescopes such as the One-Mile Telescope, Australia Telescope Compact Array and the Ryle Telescope. Its equatorial mount is what sets it apart from most other radio telescopes, most of which have an altazimuth mount. This makes it specifically useful for specific types of science, like polarized emission research as the detectors maintain a constant orientation on the sky during an observation. Ten of the telescopes are on fixed mountings while the remaining four dishes are movable along two rail tracks. The telescope was completed in 1970 and underwent a major upgrade between 1995 – 2000.

The telescopes in the array can operate at several frequencies between 120 MHz and 8.3 GHz with an instantaneous bandwidth of 120 MHz and 8092-line spectral resolution. The WSRT is often combined with other telescopes around the world to perform very-long-baseline interferometry (VLBI) observations, being part of the European VLBI Network. The telescope is operated by ASTRON, the Netherlands Institute for Radio Astronomy.

WSRT performed a major upgrade in 2013 as part of the APERTIF (APERture Tile In Focus) project, where the current detectors were replaced with focal-plane arrays. The telescope was out of operation for the upgrade from 2015 to 2019, which allows a 25x larger field of view. The upgraded telescope is used for large scale surveys of the northern sky, bringing back focus on the hydrogen line for which it was originally designed, but also large pulsar searches and other science.

The WSRT is also an International GNSS Service site.

WSRT observed galaxies in the Spitzer Infrared Nearby Galaxies Survey at wavelengths of 18 and 22 cm (7.1 and 8.7 in).

The WSRT site has also hosted one of the two experimental Electronic MultiBeam Radio Astronomy ConcEpt (EMBRACE) phased array telescopes, which was at the time a possible prototype for the Square Kilometre Array (SKA) project.

== See also ==
- Low-Frequency Array (LOFAR)
