= List of national mapping agencies =

This is a list of national mapping agencies (NMA) in the world. Many of these agencies developed themselves through time into an national mapping and cadastral authority (NMCA) and nowadays as a national mapping and geospatial information agency (NMGA).

== List ==
=== Africa ===
| Country or territory | National mapping agency (Note: Names in the languages listed on the agency's website) | Web site | Online map viewer | Notes |
|---|---|---|---|---|
| Algeria | المعهد الوطني للخرائط و الكشف عن بعد; Institut National de Cartographie et de Télédétection; National Institute of Cartography and Teledetection | inct.mdn.dz | | |
| Bénin | Institut Géographique National du Bénin (IGN) | ign.bj | Geoportal 2 (planned); Geoportal 1 (hidden) | |
| Botswana | Department of Surveys and Mapping | mlh.gov.bw | | |
| Burkina Faso | Institut Géographique du Burkina | igb.bb (offline>webarchive) | | |
| Egypt | Egyptian general Survey Authority (ESA) | esa.gov.eg | Egy-GeoInfo (Egyptian Geospatial Information Portal) | |
| Ethiopia | የኢትዮጵያ ካርታ ሥራ ኤጀንሲ; Ethiopian Mapping Agency | ema.gov.et | | |
| Ghana | Lands Commission | ghanalap.gov.gh | | |
| Kenya | Survey of Kenya | lands.go.ke | | |
| Madagascar | Institut Géographique et Hydrographique National | ftm.mg | | |
| Maldives | Maldives Land and Survey Authority | surveyofmaldives.gov.mv | onemap.mv (ESRI Login) | |
| Mali | Institut Géographique du Mali (IGM) | igm-mali.ml | | |
| Morocco | Agence Nationale de la Conservation Foncière du Cadastre et de la Cartographie (ANCFCC) | ancfcc.gov.ma | | |
| Mozambique | Centro Nacional de Cartografia e Teledetecção (CENACARTA) | | | |
| Nigeria | Office of the Surveyor-General of the Federation (OSGOF) | osgof.gov.ng | | |
| Senegal | Direction des Travaux Géographiques et Cartographiques; Agence Nationale pour l'Aménagement du Territoire | au-senegal.com anat.sn | BaseGeo | |
| South Africa | Chief Directorate: National Geo-spatial Information | ngi.gov.za | | |
| Tunisia | Office de la Topographie et du Cadastre (OTC) | otc.nat.tn | | |
| Uganda | Department of Surveys and Mapping | mlhud.go.ug | | |

=== Americas ===
| Country or territory | National mapping agency | Web site | Online map viewer | Notes |
|---|---|---|---|---|
| Argentina | Instituto Geográfico Nacional | ign.gob.ar | | |
| Bahamas | Bahamas National Geographic Information Systems (BNGIS) Centre | bahamas.gov.bs | | |
| Barbados | Lands and Surveys Department | landsandsurveys.gov.bb | | |
| Belize | Lands and Surveys Department | mnra.gov.bz | | |
| Bolivia | Instituto Geográfico Militar | igmbolivia.gob.bo | Geoportal | |
| Brazil | Instituto Brasileiro de Geografia e Estatística (IBGE) | ibge.gov.br | Portal de Mapas and GeoFTP Downloads | |
| Canada | Natural Resources Canada – Canada Centre for Mapping and Earth Observation | nrcan.gc.ca | Toporama | |
| Chile | Instituto Geográfico Militar | igm.cl | | |
| Colombia | Instituto Geográfico Agustín Codazzi (IGAC) | igac.gov.co | Geoportal | |
| Costa Rica | Instituto Geográfico Nacional | registronacional.go.cr | | |
| Cuba | Instituto de Geografía Tropical | geotech.cu | | |
| Dominican Republic | Instituto Geográfico Nacional José Joaquín Hungría Morell | ign.gob.do | | |
| Ecuador | Instituto Geográfico Militar (IGM) | igm.gob.ec | Geoportal IGM | |
| El Salvador | Instituto Geográfico y del Catastro Nacional (IGCN) | cnr.gob.sv | Visualizador Geográfico | |
| Guatemala | Instituto Geográfico Nacional (IGN) | ign.gob.gt | | |
| Guyana | Guyana Lands and Survey Commission | lands.gov.gy | | |
| Honduras | Dirección General de Catastro y Geografía (DGCG) | dgcg.ip.gob.hn | Visor de Mapas | |
| Jamaica | National Spatial Data Management Division (NSDMD) | mwh.gov.jm | | |
| Mexico | Instituto Nacional de Estadística y Geografía (INEGI) | inegi.org.mx | Mapa digital de México | |
| Nicaragua | Instituto Nicaragüense de Estudios Territoriales (INETER) | ineter.gob.ni | | |
| Panama | Instituto Geográfico Nacional "Tommy Guardia" | ignpanama.anati.gob.pa | | |
| Paraguay | Dirección del Servicio Geográfico Militar (DISERGEMIL) | disergemil.mil.py | | |
| Peru | Instituto Geográfico Nacional | ign.gob.pe | | |
| Puerto Rico | Sistemas de Información Geográfica (GIS) | pr.gov | | |
| Suriname | | | National SLMS Geoportal or SLMS Geoportal | |
| Trinidad and Tobago | Survey and Mapping Division | agriculture.gov.tt | | |
| United States | United States Geological Survey | usgs.gov | National Map | See also: USGS quadrangle |
| Uruguay | Servicio Geografico Militar | sgm.gub.uy | | |
| Venezuela | Instituto Geográfico de Venezuela Simón Bolívar (IGVSB) | igvsb.gob.ve | | |

=== Asia and Pacific ===
| Country or territory | National mapping agency | Web site | Online map viewer | Notes |
|---|---|---|---|---|
| Afghanistan | Afghan Geodesy & Cartography Head Office اداره عمومی جیودیزی وکارتوگرافی دجیودیزی او کارتوگرافی لوی اداره | agcho.gov.af (offline) | | |
| Australia | Geoscience Australia | ga.gov.au | Geoscience Australia Data Discovery Portal, Geoscience Australia’s Digital Twin | |
| Azerbaijan | Əmlak Məsələləri Dövlət Komitəsi; State Committee on Property Issues | emdk.gov.az | | |
| Bahrain | الجهاز المركزي للمعلومات; Central Informatics Organization | cio.gov.bh | | |
| Bangladesh | বাংলাদেশ জরিপ অধিদপ্তর; Survey of Bangladesh | sob.gov.bd | | |
| Brunei | Jabatan Ukur; Survey Department | mod.gov.bn/survey | Geoportal | |
| Cambodia | General Department of Cadastre and Geography | | | |
| China | 国家测绘地理信息局; National Administration of Surveying, Mapping and Geoinformation | nasg.gov.cn | | |
| Fiji | Mapping and Land Information | lands.gov.fj | | |
| Hong Kong | 地政總署測繪處; Survey and Mapping Office (SMO) | landsd.gov.hk | GeoInfo Map | |
| India | Survey of India | surveyofindia.gov.in | | |
| Indonesia | Badan Informasi Geospasial; Geospatial Information Agency | big.go.id | Ina-Geoportal | |
| Iran | سازمان نقشه برداری کشور; National Cartographic Center | ncc.org.ir | map.ir | |
| Israel | המרכז למיפוי ישראל; Survey Of Israel | mapi.gov.il | govMap | |
| Japan | 国土地理院; Geospatial Information Authority of Japan (GSI) | gsi.go.jp | GSI maps | |
| Jordan | للمركـز الجغـرافي الملكـي الأردني; Royal Jordanian Geographic Centre (RJGC) | rjgc.gov.jo | | |
| Laos | National Geographic Department of Lao (NGD) | ngd.la | Geoportal WMS | |
| Macao | Direcção dos Serviços de Cartografia e Cadastro (DSCC) | dscc.gov.mo | | |
| Malaysia | Rasmi Jabatan Ukur dan Pemetaan Malaysia (JUPEM); Department of Survey and Mapping Malaysia | jupem.gov.my | | |
| Nepal | नापी विभाग; Survey Department | dos.gov.np | | |
| New Zealand | Toitū Te Whenua; Land Information New Zealand (LINZ) | linz.govt.nz | | |
| Oman | The National Survey Authority (Oman) | nsaom.org.om | | |
| Pakistan | Survey of Pakistan | surveyofpakistan.gov.pk | | |
| Palestine | Palestine Ministry of Local Government | | GeoMOLG | |
| Philippines | National Mapping and Resource Information Authority | namria.gov.ph | Philippine geoportal | |
| Qatar | Qatari Center for Geographic Information Systems (QCGIS) | gisqatar.org.qa | | |
| Republic of Korea | National Geographic Information Institute | ngii.go.kr | | |
| Russia | Федеральная служба государственной регистрации, кадастра и картографии Federal Service for State Registration, Cadastre and Cartography (Rosreestr) | rosreestr.ru | Rosreestr Interactive Map | |
| Saudi Arabia | General Commission for Survey (Saudi Arabia) | gcs.gov.sa | | |
| Singapore | Singapore Land Authority | sla.gov.sg | Onemap v2 | |
| Sri Lanka | Department of Survey | survey.gov.lk | | |
| Taiwan | 中華民國內政部國土測繪中心; National Land Surveying and Mapping Center (NLSC) | nlsc.gov.tw | | |
| Thailand | Royal Thai Survey Department | rtsd.mi.th | WebGIS | |
| Uzbekistan | O’zdavgeodezkadastr (State committee of land resources, geodesy, cartography and cadastre of Uzbekistan) or Yergeodezkadastr or Kadastr | ygk.uz > | | |
| Vietnam | Cục Đo đạc và Bản đồ thông tin địa lý Việt Nam; Department of Survey, Mapping and Geographic Information of Viet Nam | dosm.gov.vn | | |
| Yemen | Survey Authority | survey-authority.gov.ye | | |

=== Europe ===
| Country or territory | National mapping agency | Web site | Online map viewer | Notes |
|---|---|---|---|---|
| Albania | State Authority for Geospatial Information (ASIG); Autoriteti Shtetëror për Informacionin Gjeohapësinor | asig.gov.al | Map layers | |
| Andorra | Ministeri d'Urbanisme i Ordenament Territorial, Govern d'Andorra | cartografiandorra.ad | | |
| Armenia | Կառավարությանն առընթեր անշարժ գույքի կադաստրի պետական կոմիտե | cadastre.am | | |
| Austria | Bundesamt für Eich- und Vermessungswesen (BEV) | bev.gv.at | Austrian Map online | |
| Belarus | Дзяржаўны камітэт па маёмасці Рэспублікі Беларусь; Государственный комитет по имуществу Республики Беларусь | gki.gov.by | | |
| Belgium | Nationaal Geografisch Instituut (NGI); Institut géographique national (IGN) | ngi.be ign.be | Topomap Viewer | |
| Bosnia and Hercegovina | Federal Administration for Geodetic and Property Affairs; Republic administration for geodetic and property affairs | fgu.com.ba rgurs.org | Geoportal; Geoportal | |
| Bulgaria | Агенция по геодезия, картография и кадастър (АГКК); Geodesy, Cartography and Cadastre Agency | cadastre.bg | | |
| Croatia | Državna geodetska uprava (DGU) | dgu.gov.hr | Geoportal DGU | |
| Cyprus | Tmima Ktimatologiou Kai Chorometrias; Department of Lands and Surveys | moi.gov.cy | | |
| Czech Republic | Český úřad zeměměřický a katastrální (ČÚZK); Czech Office for Surveying, Mapping and Cadastre | cuzk.cz | Geoprohlížeč | |
| Denmark | Geodatastyrelsen; Danish Geodata Agency | gst.dk | Matrikelkort | including Faroe Islands and Greenland |
| Estonia | Maa-amet; Estonian Land Board | maaamet.ee | Geoportal | |
| Finland | Maanmittauslaitos (MML); Lantmäteriverket (LMV); National Land Survey of Finland (NLS) | maanmittauslaitos.fi | MapSite Open Data Geoportal | |
| France | Institut national de l'information géographique et forestière (IGN); National Institute of Geographic and Forest Information (IGN) | ign.fr | Géoportail | |
| Germany | Bundesamt für Kartographie und Geodäsie (BKG); Federal Agency for Cartography and Geodesy | bkg.bund.de | Geoportal.de | excluding 1:5000 – 1:100 000 |
| Greece | Γεωγραφική Υπηρεσία Στρατού (ΓΥΣ); Hellenic Military Geographical Service (HMGS) | gys.gr | | |
| Hungary | Földmérési és Távérzékelési Intézet (fömi); Institute of Geodesy, Cartography and Remote Sensing | fomi.hu | | |
| Iceland | Náttúrufræðistofnun; Natural Science Institute of Iceland | natt.is | | |
| Ireland | Tailte Éireann | tailte.ie | GeoHive Map Viewer | Formerly Ordnance Survey Ireland/Suirbhéireacht Ordanáis Éireann (OSI/SOÉ) |
| Italy | Istituto Geografico Militare | igmi.org | | |
| Kosovo | Kosovo Cadastral Agency | | Gjeoportali shtetëror | |
| Latvia | Latvijas Geotelpiskas Informacijas Agentura (LGIA); Latvian Geospatial Information Agency (LGIA) | lgia.gov.lv | Karšu pārlūks | |
| Lebanon | مديرية الشؤون الجفرافية; Direction des affaires géographiques Directorate of Geographic Affairs | lebarmy.gov.lb | | |
| Lithuania | Nacionalinės žemės tarnybos (NŽT); National Land Service | nzt.lt | geoportal.lt | |
| Luxembourg | Administration du Cadastre et de la Topographie | etat.lu | | |
| Malta | Planning Authority | pa.org.mt | | |
| Montenegro | Uprava za nekretnine | nekretnine.co.me | Geoportal | |
| Netherlands | Kadaster | kadaster.nl | PDOK viewer Topotijdreis | excluding Caribbean Netherlands |
| North Macedonia | Агенција за катастар на недвижности (AKH); Agjencia e kadastrës së pasurisë së patundshme (AKPP); Agency for Real Estate Cadastre (AREC) | katastar.gov.mk | OSSP | |
| Norway | Statens Kartverk; Norwegian Mapping Authority | kartverket.no | Norgeskart | |
| Poland | Główny Urząd Geodezji i Kartografii; Head Office of Geodesy and Cartography (GUGIK) | gugik.edu.pl | Geoportal | |
| Portugal | Instituto Geográfico Português | igeo.pt | | |
| Romania | Agentia Nationala de Cadastru si Publicitate Imobiliara | ancpi.ro | | |
| Serbia | Republički geodetski zavod (RGZ); Republic Geodetic Authority | rgz.gov.rs | Geoportal geoSrbija | |
| Slovakia | Úrad geodézie, kartografie a katastra (Authority of Geodesy, Cartography and Cadastre) | skgeodesy.sk Kataster | Geoportal; Mapový Klient ZBGIS; Cadrastal portal | |
| Slovenia | Surveying and Mapping Authority of the Republic of Slovenia | gu.gov.si | Map viewer | |
| Spain | Instituto Geográfico Nacional | ign.es centrodedescargas.cnig.es | Iberpix | |
| Sweden | Lantmäteriet | lantmateriet.se | Min karta and GeoTorget Open Data Geoportal | |
| Switzerland | Swisstopo | swisstopo.admin.ch | Maps of Switzerland | |
| Turkey | Harita Genel Müdürlüğü | harita.gov.tr | HGM-Atlas and HGM-GeoPortal | |
| United Kingdom | Great Britain; Ordnance Survey (OS) | ordnancesurvey.co.uk | OS Maps online (Note: Ordnance Survey does not publicly make available its leisure maps (Explorer and Landranger map series), nor its most detailed mapping. However, the latter can be freely accessed on other government websites such as https://search-property-information.service.gov.uk/search/search-by-map/) | |
| United Kingdom | Northern Ireland; Ordnance Survey of Northern Ireland (OSNI) | https://www.nidirect.gov.uk/campaigns/ordnance-survey-of-northern-ireland | Spatial NI Map Viewer | |
| Ukraine | State Service of Ukraine for Geodesy, Cartography and Cadastre (StateGeoCadastre); Ukrainian: Derzhavna sluzhba Ukrainy z pytan heodezii, kartohrafii ta kadastru (DerzhHeoKadastr) | land.gov.ua/en/ | Public cadastral map of Ukraine | |

== More Information ==
- Members of the UN SALB program
- Members of the ICA
- Global GeoPortal Map (GGPM)
- About governmental contributors of data in OpenStreetMap
- Open Data Portals
- GeoPortals of FID Karten at Berlin State Library
