= Triangulation station =

Fixed surveying station used in geodetic surveying

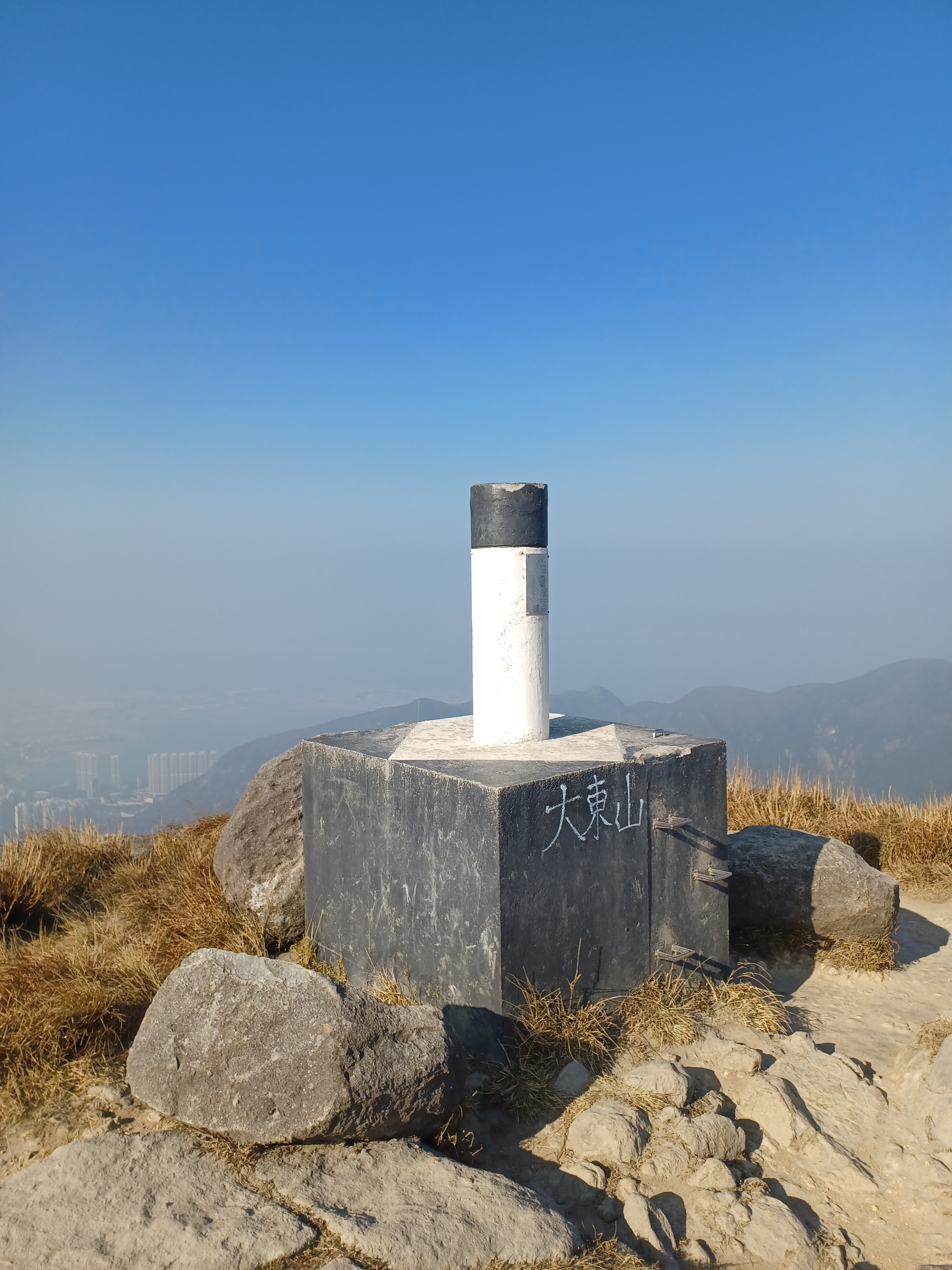
A trigonometrical station on Sunset Peak, Hong Kong

A triangulation station, also known as a trigonometrical point, and sometimes informally as a trig, is a fixed surveying station, used in geodetic surveying and other surveying projects in its vicinity.

The station is usually set up by a mapping organisation with known coordinates and elevation published. Numerous stations are installed on summits for purposes of visibility and prominence. A graven metal plate on the top of a pillar may provide a mounting point for a theodolite or reflector, often using some form of kinematic coupling to ensure reproducible positioning.

== Use ==
Trigonometrical stations form networks of triangulation. Positions of land boundaries, roads, railways, bridges and other infrastructure can be accurately located by the network, a task essential to the construction of modern infrastructure. Apart from the known stations set up by government, some temporary trigonometrical stations are set up near construction sites for monitoring the precision and progress of construction.

Some trigonometrical stations use the Global Positioning System for convenience. Its accuracy factors in ionospheric and tropospheric propagation delay errors.

Although stations are no longer required for many modern surveying purposes, they remain useful to hikers and even aviators as navigational aids. Particular small triangles on maps (◬) mark summits, for example.

== Worldwide ==
The nomenclature for triangulation stations varies regionally: they are generally known as trigonometrical stations or triangulation stations in North America, trig points in the United Kingdom, trig pillars in Ireland, trig stations or trig points in Australia and New Zealand, and trig beacons in South Africa.

=== Australia ===
In the 1820s, much of New South Wales was unsurveyed territory to the European arrivals. To aid the mapping of the country, the science of trigonometic surveying was introduced by Major Thomas Mitchell who had been brought out to the colony as Assistant Surveyor General of New South Wales. The freestanding peak of Mount Jellore was selected as the first trigonometric summit for his triangulation survey of the countryside. In 1828 Mitchell headed south from Sydney with a small party and camped at the base of the basalt, making daily excursions to the top. While his convict crew cleared the summit of trees, Mitchell plotted and measured distant peaks and sketched the skyline.

A national geodetic survey and adjustment carried out in the early 1970s in Australia has left a legacy of trig stations, many consisting of a ground mark with a black quadripod (pyramid frame) supporting a visible disc above the ground mark.

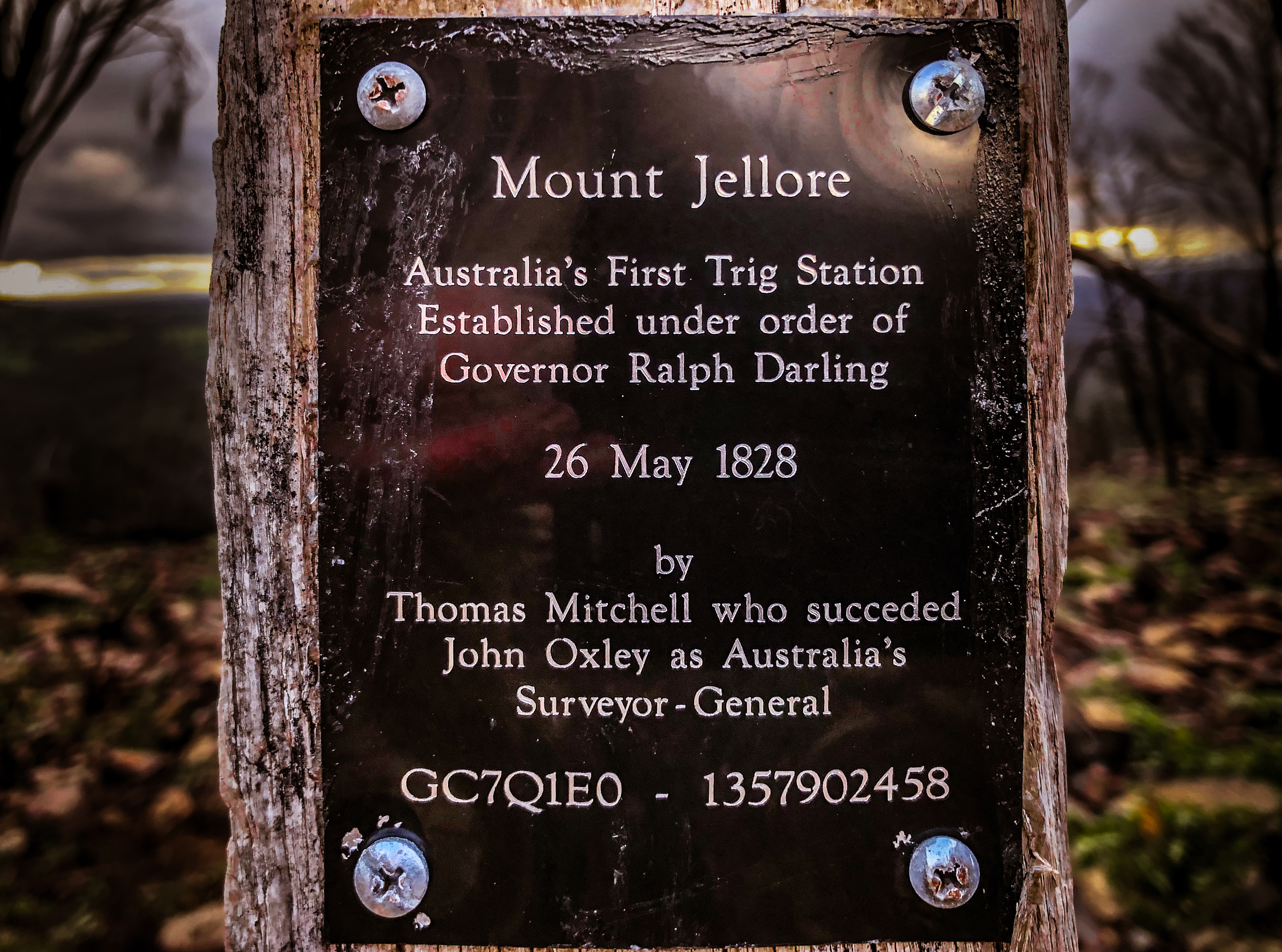
Australia's first trig

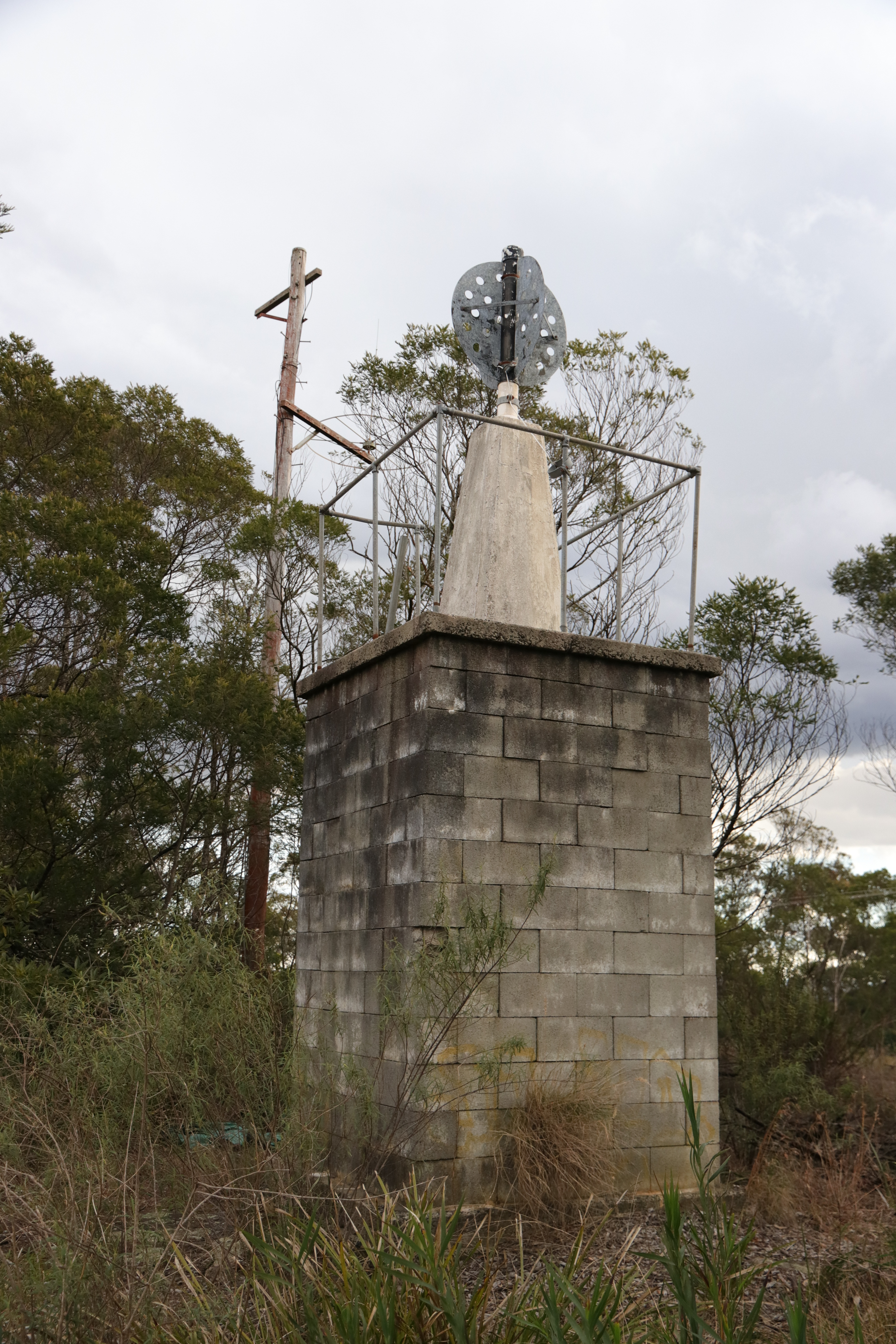
Trigonometrical station, NSW, Australia

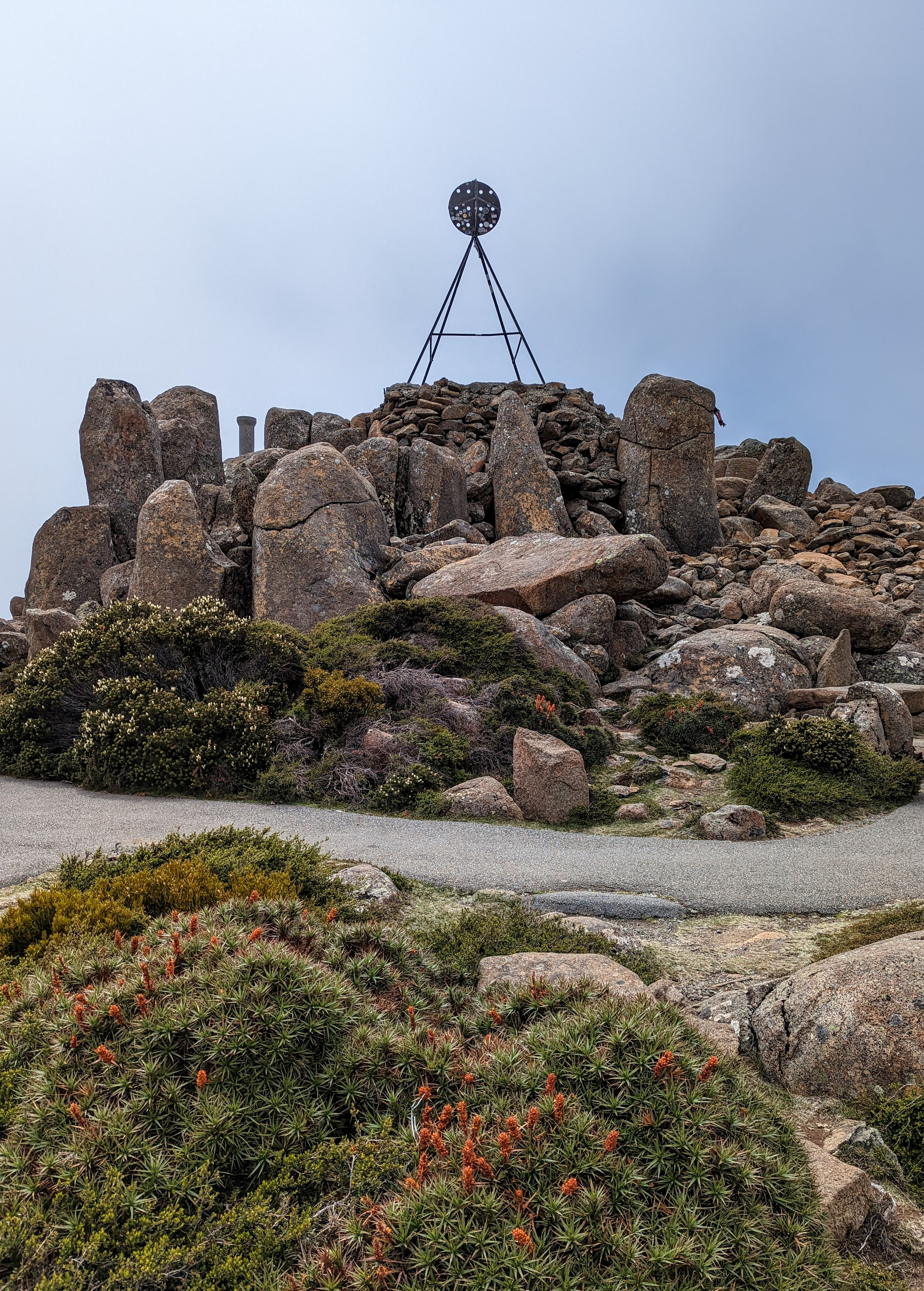
Trig point atop Mount Wellington, Tasmania

=== Hong Kong ===
Many trigonometrical stations were placed on hilltops around Hong Kong. They strongly resemble those used in other former British colonial territories such as Australia.

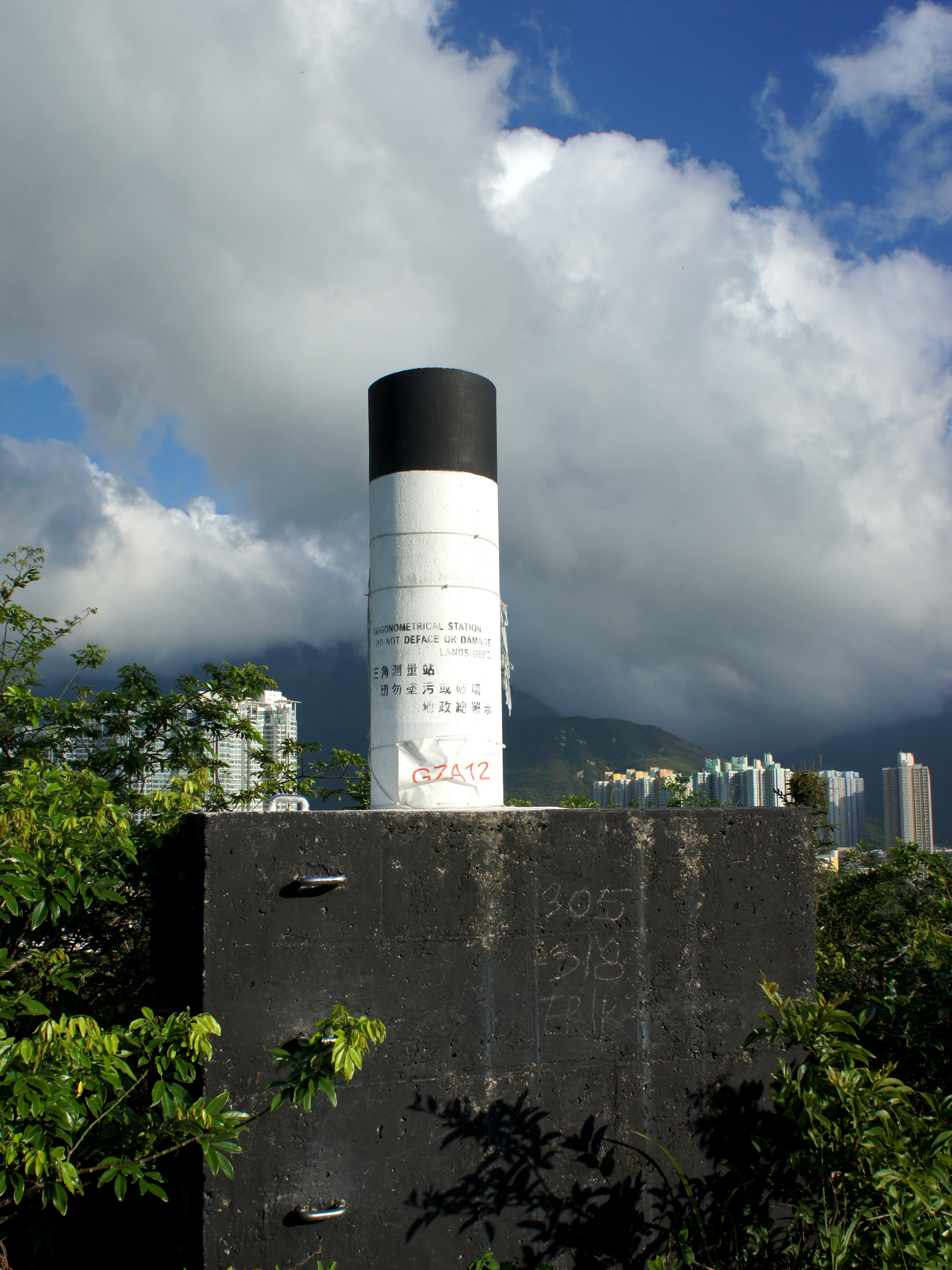
A trigonometrical station in Chek Lap Kok Scenic Hill, Hong Kong

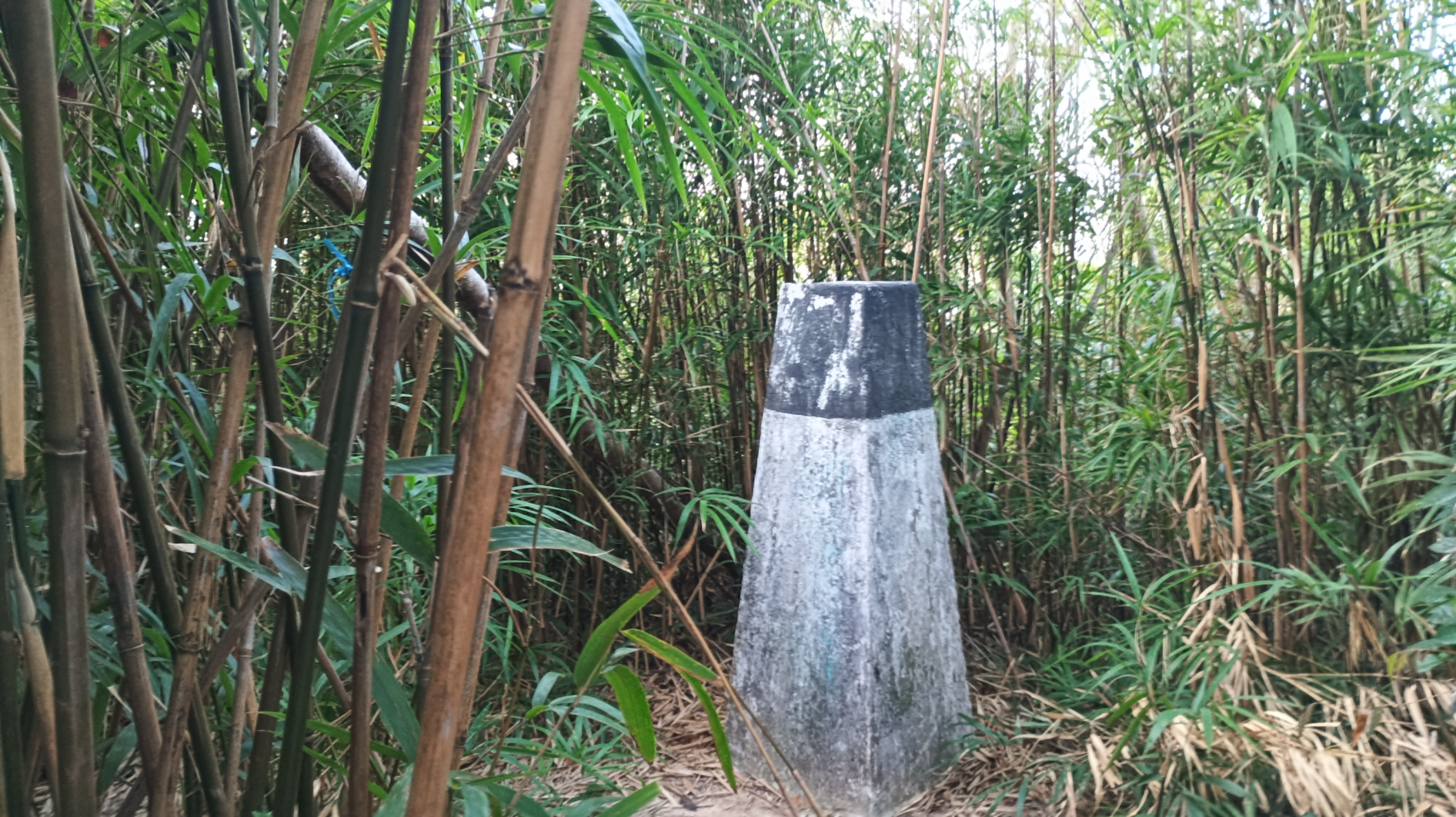
Station 1015.208.1 on Mount Davis is one of 2 Type G Beacons ever built

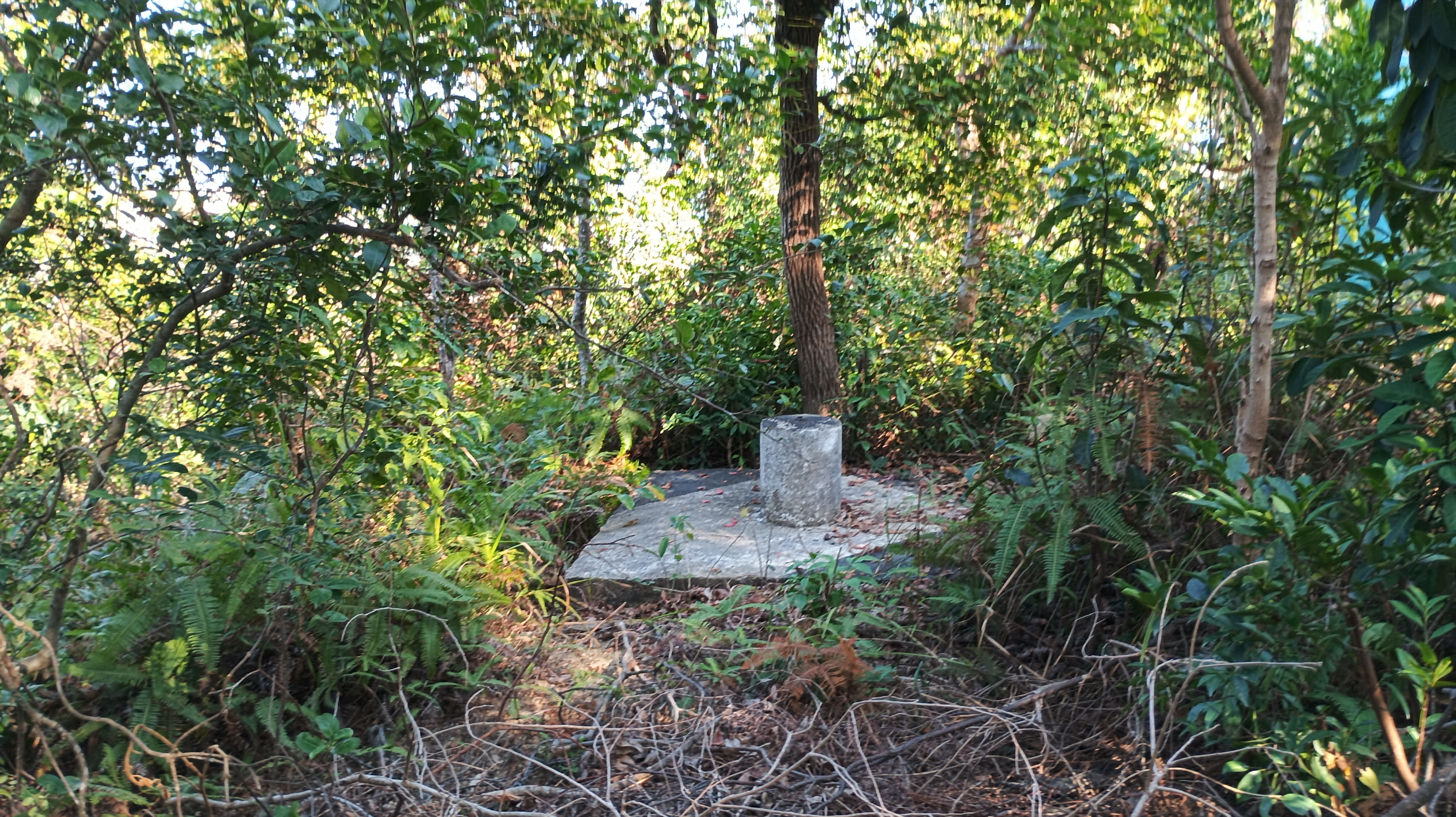
A generic Type B Beacon

==== Type A Beacon ====
The most abundant type, consisting of a pillar, height is 1.2-1.3 m tall. The body is white and consists of a black band on top. Has a triangular plate on top.

==== Type B Beacon ====
A shorter variant of Type A Beacon, at ~0.3 m tall, the pillar is white and the top is black.

==== Type C Beacon ====
The thicker variant of Type A Beacon, called "肥標" informally by hikers.

==== Type D Beacon ====
The shorter variant of Type C Beacon, typically lower than 0.8 metres tall.

==== Type E Beacon ====
A rectangular beacon with a black top, only one installed on Golden Hill, which is modified from a KWW 1902 monument.

==== Type F Beacon ====
The shorter variant of Type E Beacon, typically ~0.3 m tall, none were built.

==== Type G Beacon ====
A trapezoidal prism shaped beacon, sometimes referenced as "Old Beacon" by Surveying and Mapping Office, only 2 were built.

==== Type H Beacon ====
Shorter variant of Type G Beacon, only one were built, on Ha Fa Shan in Tsuen Wan.

==== Urban Survey Mark (USM) ====
They are small metal fixtures, commonly found on streets, and are also used as reference marks for larger stations.

==== Picket Boxes ====
Similarly to USMs, they are commonly found on streets. They look like a small circular manhole cover, with the epoxy inside.

==== Stainless Steel Rod (S/S Rod) ====
They are small concrete bricks, with a stainless steel rod fixed in it, they are used as bench marks.

==== Others ====
There are many more other types of surveying marks in Hong Kong, such as staples, PVC pipes, or even as simple as a nail.

==== Classes ====
Trig points and Traverse Stations in HK have a 2 class class system, they can be identified by their numbers.

==== Trig Points ====
Number less than 100: Class 1 (Except 73.1, 73.2 and 73.3)

Number Over 100: Class 2 (Including 73.1, 73.2 and 73.3)

Class 2 trig points are also numbered based on their region:

100-199: Hong Kong Island North & Kowloon

200-299: Southwest (Such as Lantau Island)

300-399: New Territories Northwest

400-499: New Territories North

500-599: New Territories South

600-699: New Territories East

===== Traverse Stations =====
1XXX.XX, 4XXX.XX, 7XXX.XX: Major Traverse Stations

2XXX.XXX, 3XXX.XXX, 5XXX.XXX, 8XXX.XXX: Minor Traverse Stations

=== Japan ===
In Japan, there are five classes of triangulation stations (三角点, sankakuten; lit. 'three corner points'):

Class 1 (一等三角点, ittō sankakuten)
They are installed approximately every 40 kilometres (25 mi), with smaller ones (as necessary) about every 25 kilometres (16 mi). There are about 1000 throughout Japan. The pillars are 18 centimetres (7.1 in) on a side, and each pillar is anchored with two very large perpendicular rocks buried underground.

Class 2 (二等三角点, nitō sankakuten)
They are installed approximately every 8 kilometres (5.0 mi). There are about 5000 throughout Japan, and the pillars are 15 centimetres (5.9 in) on a side. Each pillar is anchored with a very large perpendicular rock buried underground.

Class 3 (三等三角点, santō sankakuten)
There are about 32,000 installed throughout Japan, with one approximately every 4 kilometres (2.5 mi). The pillars are 15 centimetres (5.9 in) on a side, and each pillar is anchored with a large perpendicular rock buried underground.

Class 4 (四等三角点, yontō sankakuten)
They are installed approximately every 2 kilometres (1.2 mi), and there are about 69,000 throughout Japan. The pillars are 12 centimetres (4.7 in) on a side, and each pillar is anchored with a large perpendicular rock buried underground.

Class 5 (五等三角点, gotō sankakuten)
These markers were installed in 1899 and are the predecessors to the modern triangulation stations used in Japan today. They are generally not used anymore since the installation of the Class 1-4 stations. Some of them still exist at various locations throughout Japan.

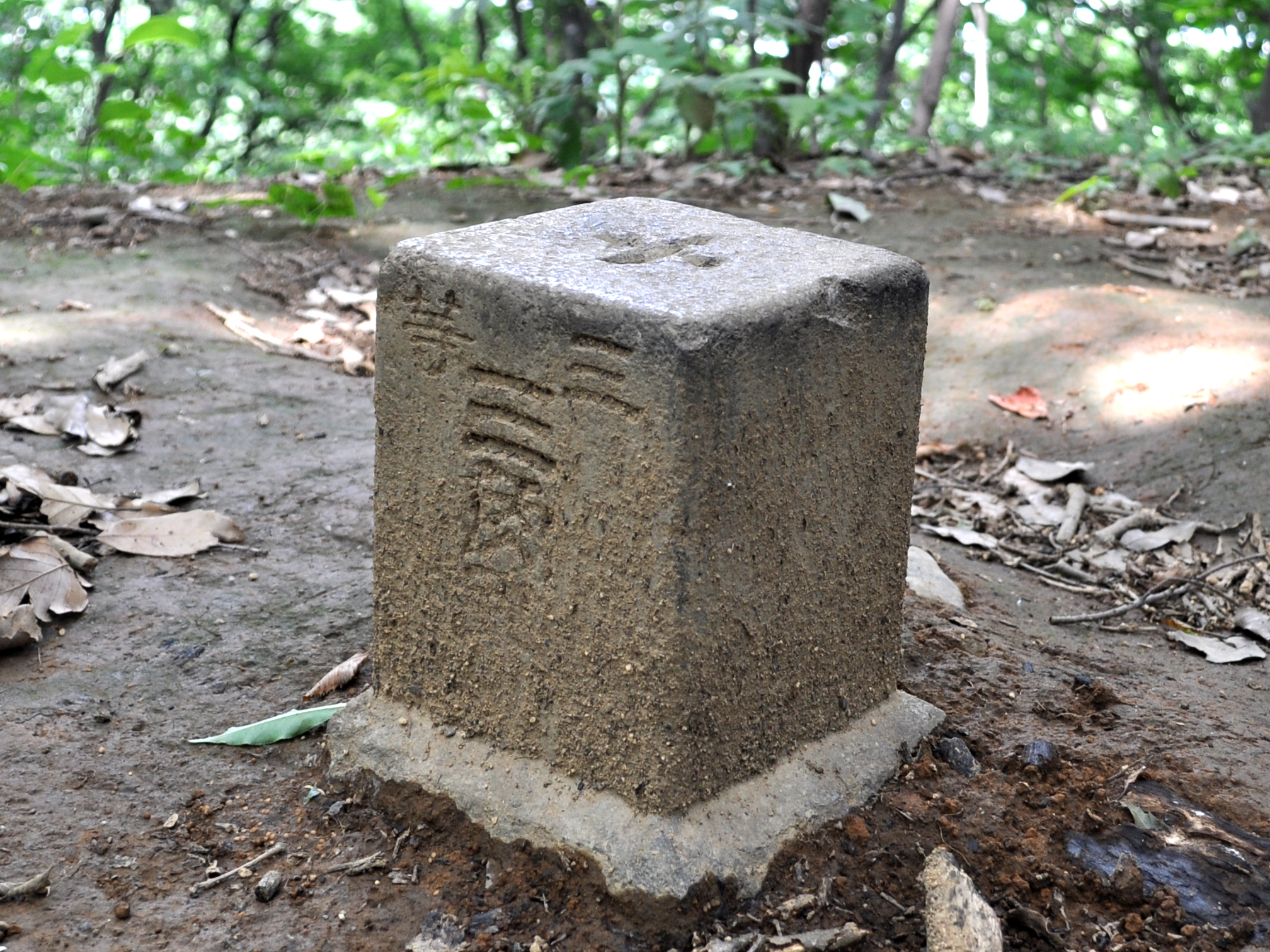
Class 3 triangulation point in Shiroyama Park in Inagi, Tokyo

=== New Zealand ===
As of August 2023 there are 5,765 trig stations in New Zealand. They are placed on top of hills and are usually black and white.

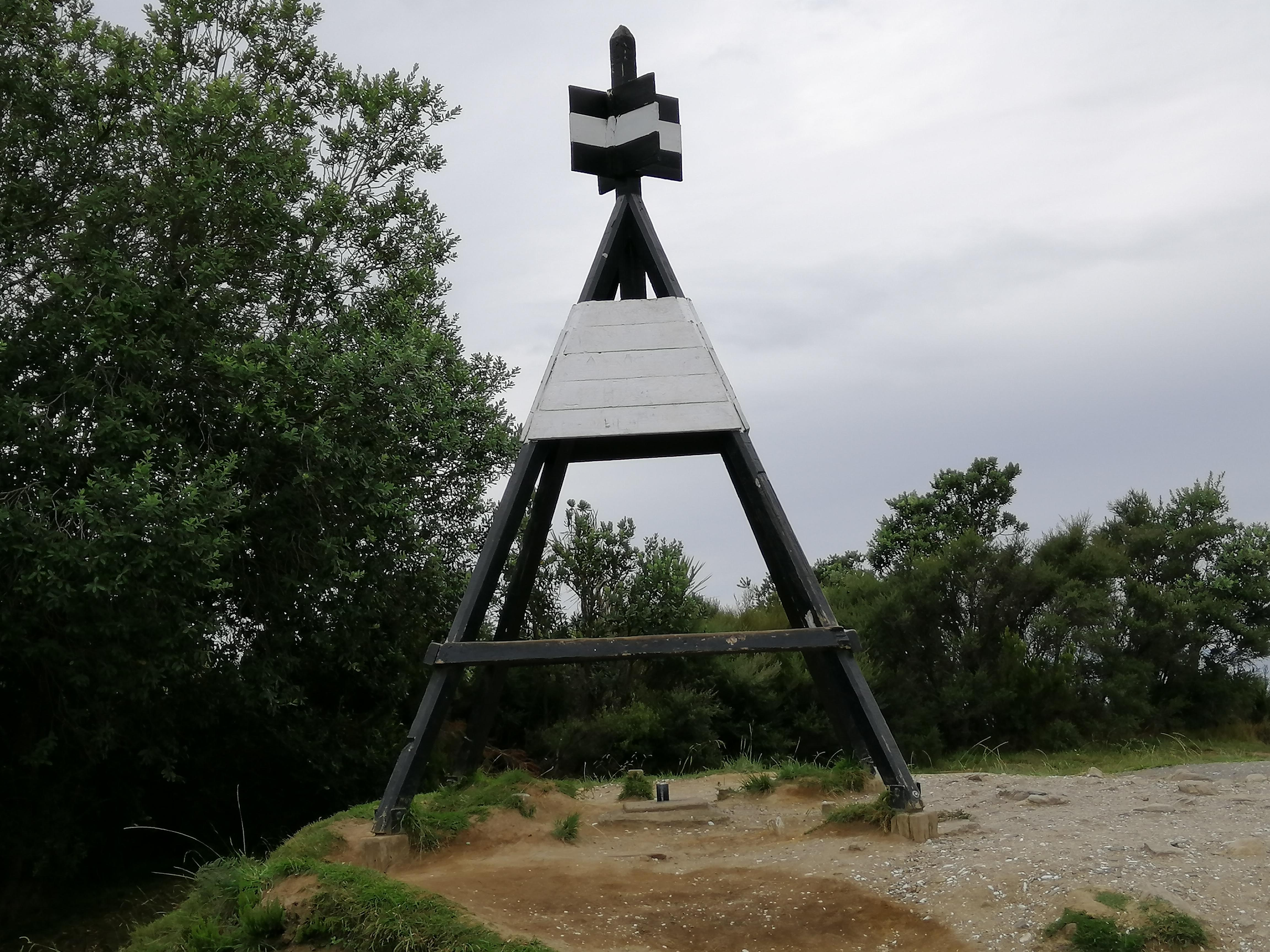
Trig station on top of Mount Maunganui

=== South Africa ===
South Africa has a network of approximately 28,000 trig beacons, established by the Chief Directorate: National Geo-spatial Information (historically known as the Trigonometrical Survey). These beacons are typically white-painted concrete pillars supporting black metal plates in a cross shape, installed on mountains, hills or tall buildings.

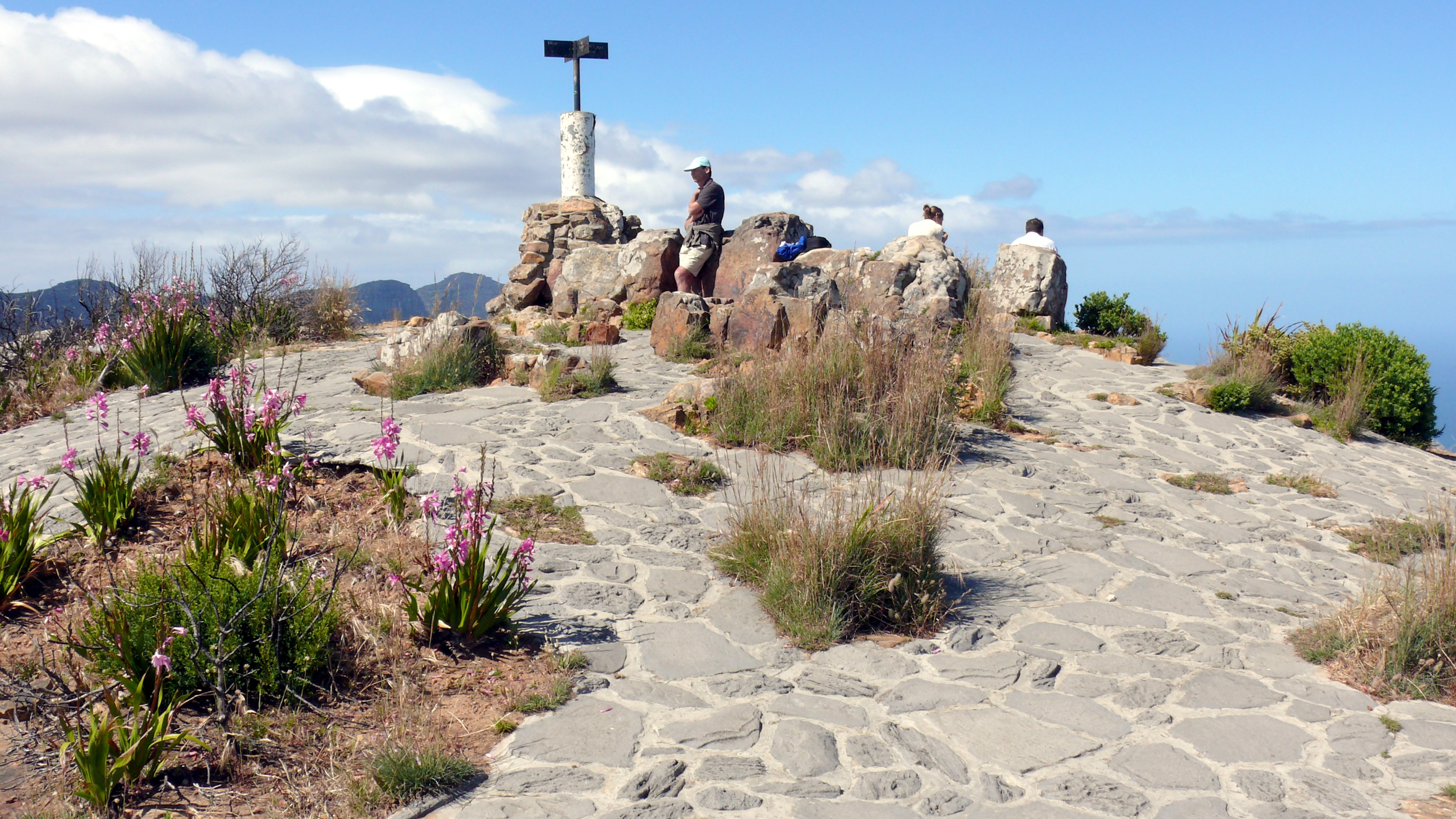
Trig beacon on the summit of Lion's Head in Cape Town

=== Spain ===
In Spain there are 11,000 triangulation stations, concrete structures which typically consist of a cylinder 120 cm high and 30 cm in diameter over a concrete cubic base.

They were erected by the Instituto Geográfico Nacional, usually painted in white, and may be marked with a metallic label with the warning: "The destruction of this sign is punishable by law."

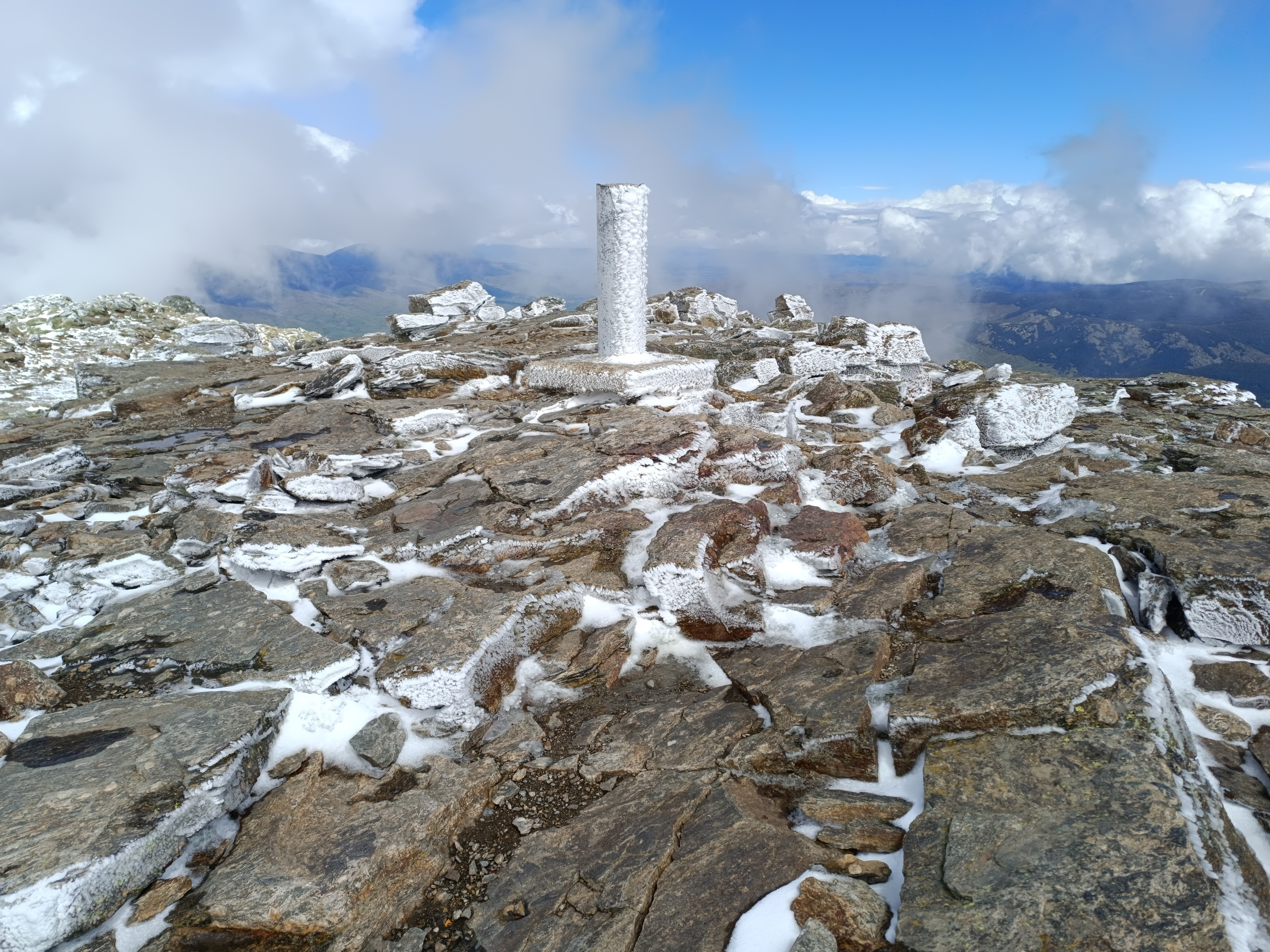
Trigonometric station on the top of Peñalara mountain (Spain)

=== United Kingdom ===
In the United Kingdom, trig points are typically concrete pillars and were erected by the Ordnance Survey.

The process of placing trig points on top of prominent hills and mountains began in 1935 to assist in the accurate retriangulation of Great Britain. The Ordnance Survey's first trig point was erected on 18 April 1936 near Cold Ashby, Northamptonshire. In low-lying or flat areas some trig points are only a few metres above sea level and one is even at −1 m (near Little Ouse, Cambridgeshire, TL61718 89787). When all the trig points were in place, it was possible in clear weather to see at least two other trig points from any one trig point, but subsequent vegetation growth means that this is not necessarily still the case. Careful measurements of the angles between the lines-of-sight of the other trig points then allowed the construction of a system of triangles which could then be referenced back to a single baseline to construct a highly accurate measurement system that covered the entire country.

In most of the UK, trig points are truncated square concrete (occasionally stone) pyramids or obelisks tapering towards the top. On the top a brass plate with three arms and a central depression is fixed, known as a "spider": it is used to mount and centre a theodolite used to take angular measurements to neighbouring trig points. A benchmark is usually set on the side, marked with the letters "O S B M" (Ordnance Survey Bench Mark) and the reference number of the trig point on a plaque called a "flush plate". Within and below the visible trig point, there are concealed reference marks whose National Grid References are precisely known. The standard trig point design is credited to Brigadier Martin Hotine (1898–1968), head of the Trigonometrical and Levelling Division of the Ordnance Survey. Many of them are now disappearing from the countryside as their function has largely been superseded by aerial photography and digital mapping using lasers and GPS. To quote from a page at the OS site: "Like an iceberg, there is more of trig pillar below the surface than above it." From the same source: "Today the receivers that make up the OS Net network are coordinated to an accuracy of just 3 mm over the entire length of Great Britain."

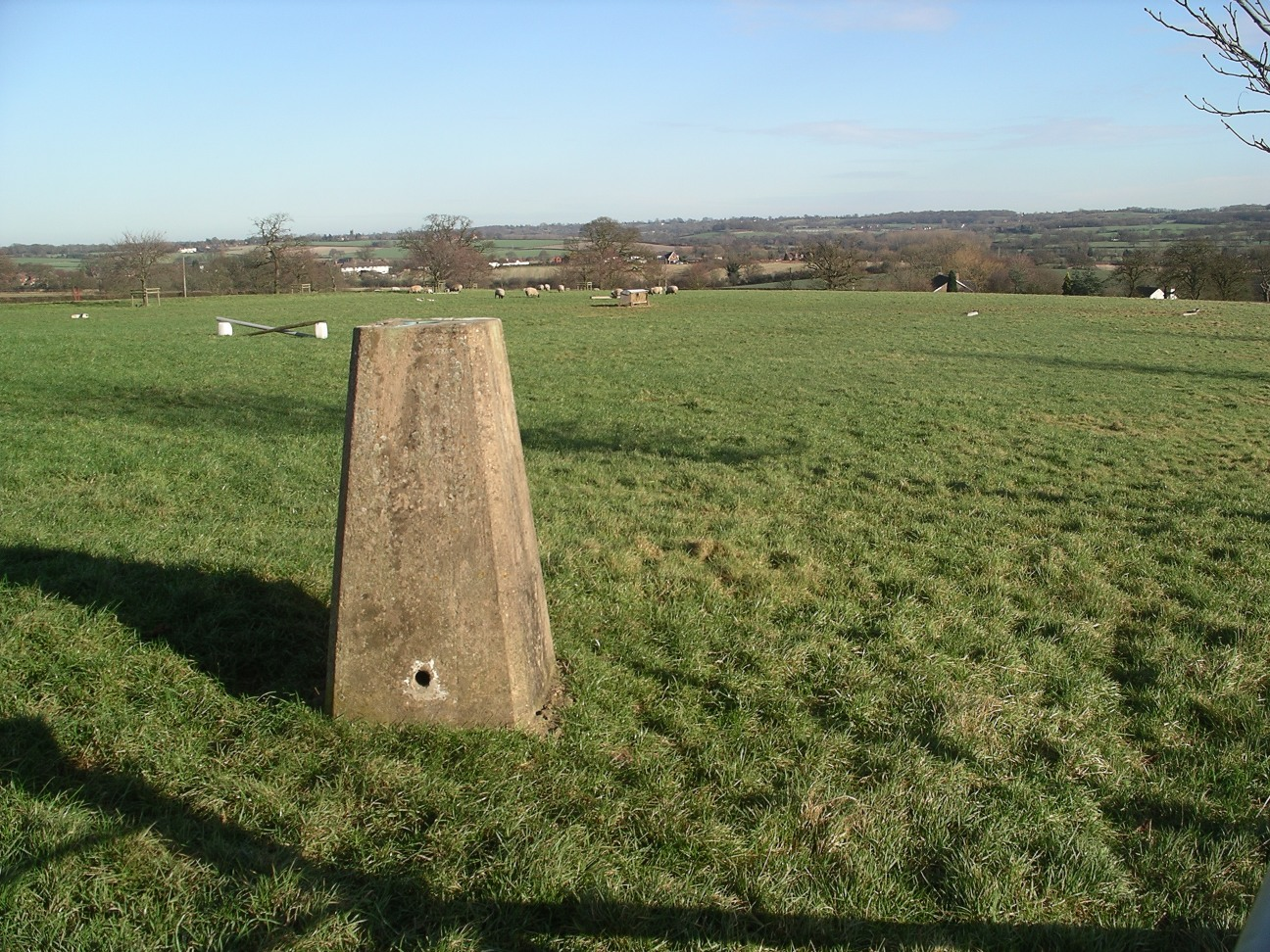
A trig point near Wootton Wawen, Warwickshire, England

=== United States ===
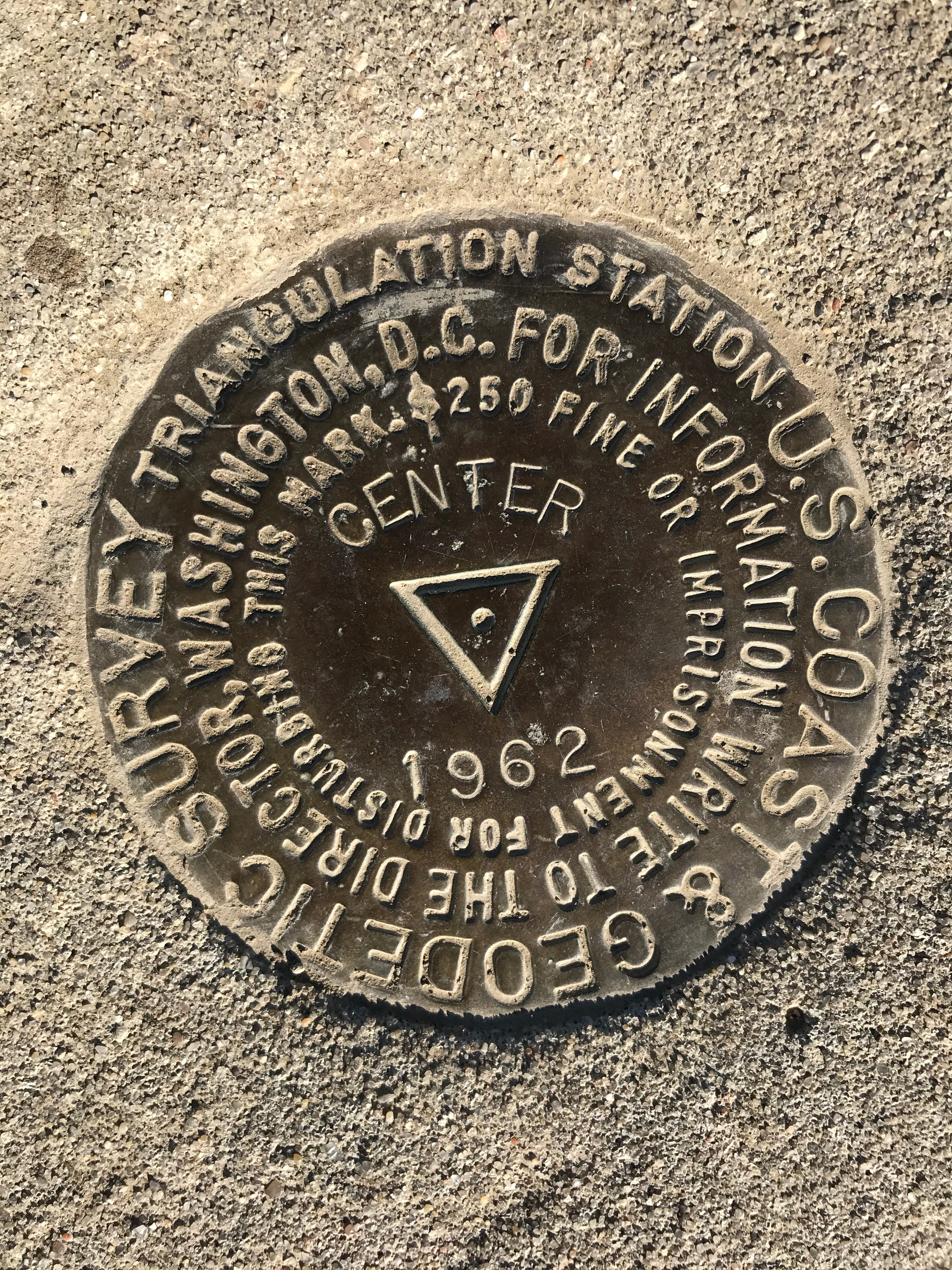
Triangulation station for the center of the United States, in South Dakota

The United States National Geodetic Survey (NGS) and predecessor agencies manages the National Spatial Reference System (NSRS), which includes permanent survey marks for horizontal position (latitude and longitude), height, or gravity. Some marks have information for both horizontal position and height. Some marks were established by NGS. Others were established by other organizations, such as state highway departments, but are included in the database that makes up the NSRS. Information about marks is available to the public online. The number of points in the NSRS is over 1,500,000.

The image is the spire of the Fair Haven, Vermont First Baptist Church, a horizontal survey mark (triangulation station), and is described in the NGS National Spatial Reference System under the permanent ID OD1373.

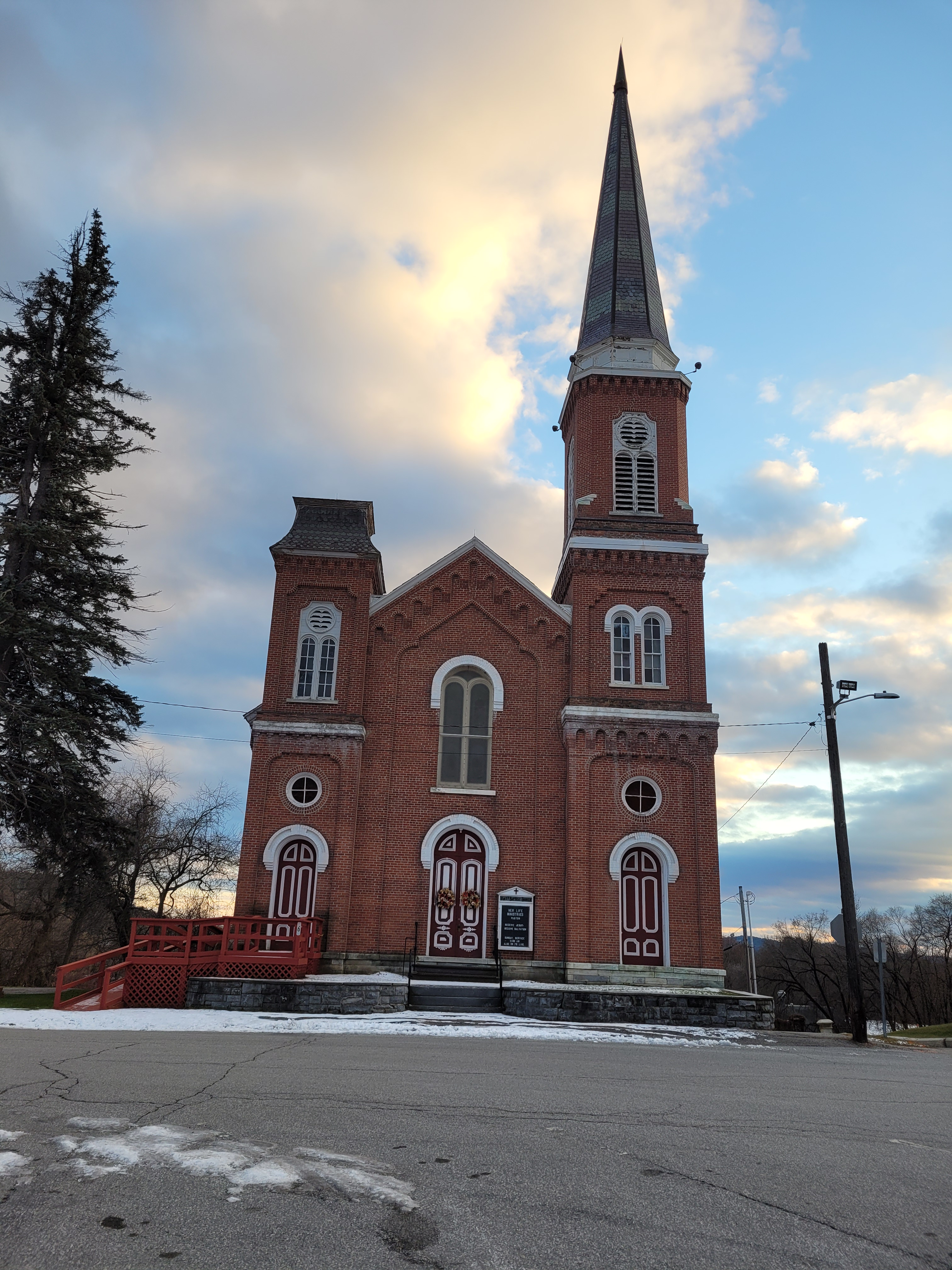
Fair Haven First Baptist Church

== See also ==
- Struve Geodetic Arc
- Benchmark (surveying)
- Bilby tower
- Boundary marker
- Geodesy
- Ordnance Survey
- Retriangulation of Great Britain
- Survey marker
- Trigpointing is a pastime in which people individually go out, find and log the location of trig points.
- Cover of Martyn Bennett's album Grit
