= National Map Reading Week =

National Map Reading Week is an awareness campaign originally created by Jonathan Elder of the Ordnance Survey, Britain's National Mapping Agency. It runs annually in the third week of October.

The goal of the awareness week is to increase public use of maps and mapping services. This followed a public survey that demonstrated many British residents were unable to accurately place key cities on a map, including London and Birmingham.

The worry over loss of skills is not a new one: research by the British Library shows concerns were expressed by historian and cartographer John Brian Hartley over the loss of traditional map skills as digital mapping was developed in the 1980s.
