= Main Office of Geodesy and Cartography =

- Główny Urząd Geodezji i Kartografii

Agency overview
- Formed: March 30, 1945; 81 years ago
- Jurisdiction: Government of Poland
- Headquarters: Warsaw; 52.229184°N 21.018378°E
- Employees: 181
- Annual budget: 52.66 mln Zloty (2018)
- Agency executive: Andrzej Żylis
- Parent agency: Surveyor General of Poland
- Website: gugik.gov.pl

Main Office of Geodesy and Cartography (Polish: Główny Urząd Geodezji i Kartografii, known in its acronym GUGiK) is a government office serving and operating under the direct leadership of the Surveyor General of Poland and is the principle national mapping agency of Poland. The Surveyor General of Poland manages the Office with the assistance of the Vice President, Director General, and directors of organizational units. Since 2023, the GUGiK headquarters has been located at 6/12 Żurawia Street in Warsaw; previously, the office was located at 2 Wspólna Street.

== History ==
The Central Office of Geodesy and Cartography (GUGiK) was established by a decree of March 30, 1945, as the Central Office of National Surveying under the Presidium of the Council of Ministers. The first president of the GUPK was engineer Jan Adam Piotrowski who was succeeded in 1948 by Edward Warchałowski. By a decree of April 24, 1952, the Central Office of National Surveying was transformed into the Central Office of Geodesy and Cartography, reporting to the Prime Minister. Its activities were largely secret. Another major change was the liquidation of the Central Office of Geodesy and Cartography in 1956 and the establishment of the Central Office of Geodesy and Cartography as an organizational division of the Ministry of Internal Affairs.

In subsequent years, the GUGiK changed ministries several times, and in 1987 it was dissolved (its functions were taken over by the Department of Geodesy, Cartography and Land Management of the Ministry of Spatial Planning and Construction).

The Main Office of Geodesy and Cartography was re-established in January 1997, reporting to the Minister of Spatial Planning and Construction. Subsequently, until 2005, GUGiK reported to the Minister of Construction, from 2007 to the Minister of Internal Affairs and Administration, from 2011 to the Minister of Administration and Digitization, and from 2015 to the minister in charge of the government administration department of Construction, Spatial Planning and Development, and Housing.

== Tasks ==
The Main Office of Geodesy and Cartography performs the tasks assigned to the Surveyor General of Poland[8], which include:

- Supervising the implementation of state policy in the field of geodesy and cartography;
- Serving as a higher-level authority within the meaning of the Code of Administrative Procedure in relation to provincial inspectors of geodetic and cartographic supervision, and supervising and controlling their activities;
- Maintaining a central geodetic and cartographic resource and managing the funds of the Central Fund for the Management of Geodetic and Cartographic Resources;
- Establishing basic geodetic, gravimetric, and magnetic networks;
- Developing principles for the technical and organizational preparation of the cadastre and collaborating in its creation;
- Maintaining the state register of borders and areas of the country's territorial divisions;
- Recording land information systems of national importance and cooperating with other ministries in establishing and maintaining geographic information systems;
- Cooperating with international and regional organizations specialized in geodesy and cartography, as well as bodies and offices of other countries;
- Initiates scientific and research-and-development work on organizational and technical standards and the application of IT, photogrammetric, and satellite methods in the field of geodesy and cartography and in the national land information system,
- Grant professional authorizations in the field of geodesy and cartography, maintain a register of authorized persons, and cooperate with local governments (Voivodeship Centers for Geodetic and Cartographic Documentation – WODGiK, Municipal Centers for Geodetic and Cartographic Documentation – MODGiK) and professional organizations of surveyors and cartographers;
- Handles matters related to the protection of classified information in geodetic and cartographic activities;
- Develops guidelines for the general valuation of real estate and supervises its process;
- Cooperates with geodetic and cartographic administration bodies in the preparation of: photogrammetric images of the country's surface, topographic maps, thematic maps, and photogrammetric studies;
- Handles matters related to geographical names, including the state register of geographical names,
- Develops rules regarding agreements regarding the location of the planned utilities networks.
