= Permanent Committee on Geographical Names =

The Permanent Committee on Geographical Names may refer to:

- Permanent Committee on Geographical Names for British Official Use, United Kingdom
- Permanent Committee on Geographical Names (Germany), Germanosphere
- Canadian Permanent Committee on Geographic Names, Canada

== See also ==
- Permanent Committee on Place Names
