= Estonian Land and Spatial Development Board =

Government agency of Estonia

- Estonian: Maa- ja Ruumiamet

Agency overview
- Formed: 16 January 1990
- Jurisdiction: Government of Estonia
- Headquarters: Mustamäe tee 51, Tallinn; 59°25′15.37″N 24°41′52.09″E
- Parent agency: Ministry of Economic Affairs and Communications
- Website: www.maaruum.ee

The Estonian Land and Spatial Development Board (Estonian: Maa- ja Ruumiamet) is an official body, dealing with cartography, cadastre and spatial development issues in Estonia. It is subordinated the Ministry of Economic Affairs and Communications. The board is a government agency that participates actively in the development and implementation of national land policy and provides the society with up-to-date land-related information. The Land Board's vision is to guarantee the availability and fitness for use of the up-to-date national land information and an efficient management of state assets.

The Land Board was founded on January 16, 1990. Its name at that time was the Estonian National Land Board and it started its work under the jurisdiction of the Ministry of Agriculture. Since June 3, 1991 the Land Board has been operating under the jurisdiction of the Ministry of the Environment.

The Land Board was established with the objective to ensure a more efficient management and use of land, organise geodetic and cartographic activities, establish the land cadastre, organise land assessment and supervise the enforcement of land tax, issue licences for land readjustment activities, solve land disputes, etc.

With years the implementation of national land policy and provision of spatial data have become the Land Board's main fields of activities, which in their turn can be subdivided into four:

• Implementation of national land policy (execution of land reform, administration of state-owned lands, acquisition of immovable properties the use of which is restricted due to nature conservation requirements, protection of state interests in planning processes)

• Maintenance of land cadastre (management of cadastral data and guaranteeing their availability to the public, organising land surveying and control of surveying quality, organising land assessment)

• Geoinformatics (management of spatial data, provision of spatial data services and coordination of geoinformation related activities)

• Capture and management of geodetic, geological and topographic data (organising the establishment of geodetic networks, organising geological mapping, mapping of the Estonian territory, providing national topographic data and maps to the society).

Land Board was named and further re-organized into Land and Spatial Development Board beginning from 1 January 2025.

== Organization ==
Director General is Kati Tamtik.

== Aircraft ==
As of July 2025 the board has a Cessna 208B aircraft, registration ES-MAA (serial number 208B1279).

== See also ==
- (List of) national mapping agencies
