= National Geographic Institute (Belgium) =

The Belgian National Geographic Institute (NGI) (French: Institut géographique national; Dutch: Nationaal Geografisch Instituut) is the Belgian national mapping agency. It is overseen by the Belgian Ministry of Defense. It collects, manages, and brokers geographic information, in the form of topographic maps, photographs, and digital geodata. It also operates the Belgian geodetic reference system.

The headquarters are located at Campus Renaissance near the Parc du Cinquantenaire/Jubelpark in Brussels. It operates Its historical collections include topographic maps of Belgium made during the German occupation of Belgium during the First World War.

In 2001, the NGI received an award from the International Cartographic Association for its 1:50,000 map of Antwerp. In 2021, the institute provided emergency services with extremely detailed photographs of disaster areas to assist with the search for missing persons.

== See also ==
- (List of) national mapping agencies
