= SSPE "Kartographia" =

State enterprise for cartography, Ukraine

- ДНВП «Картографія»
- Formation: March 3, 1944; 82 years ago
- Type: State enterprise
- Purpose: scientific research, cartography
- Headquarters: 02094, Kyiv, Ukraine 54, Hetman Pavla Polubotka St.
- Products: cartographical products
- Owner: Government of Ukraine
- Awards: 2004 Honorary Diploma of the Cabinet of Ministers of Ukraine; 2005 ICA Map awards; 2005 IMTA Atlas award; 2007 IMTA Map award; 2009 State Prize of Ukraine in Science and Technology; 2012 ICA June's Map of the Month; 2013 OSCE commendation; 2014 ICA May's Map of the Month; 2019 RIUS commendation; 2023 ICA Map award
- Website: https://kgf.com.ua

SSPE "Kartographia" (Ukrainian: ДНВП «Картографія») is the national mapping agency for Ukraine. It is a state-owned enterprise that acts as the cartography research institution of the country, producing cartographic and geographic information system products for educational institutions and the Ukrainian government.

== History ==
=== Origins ===
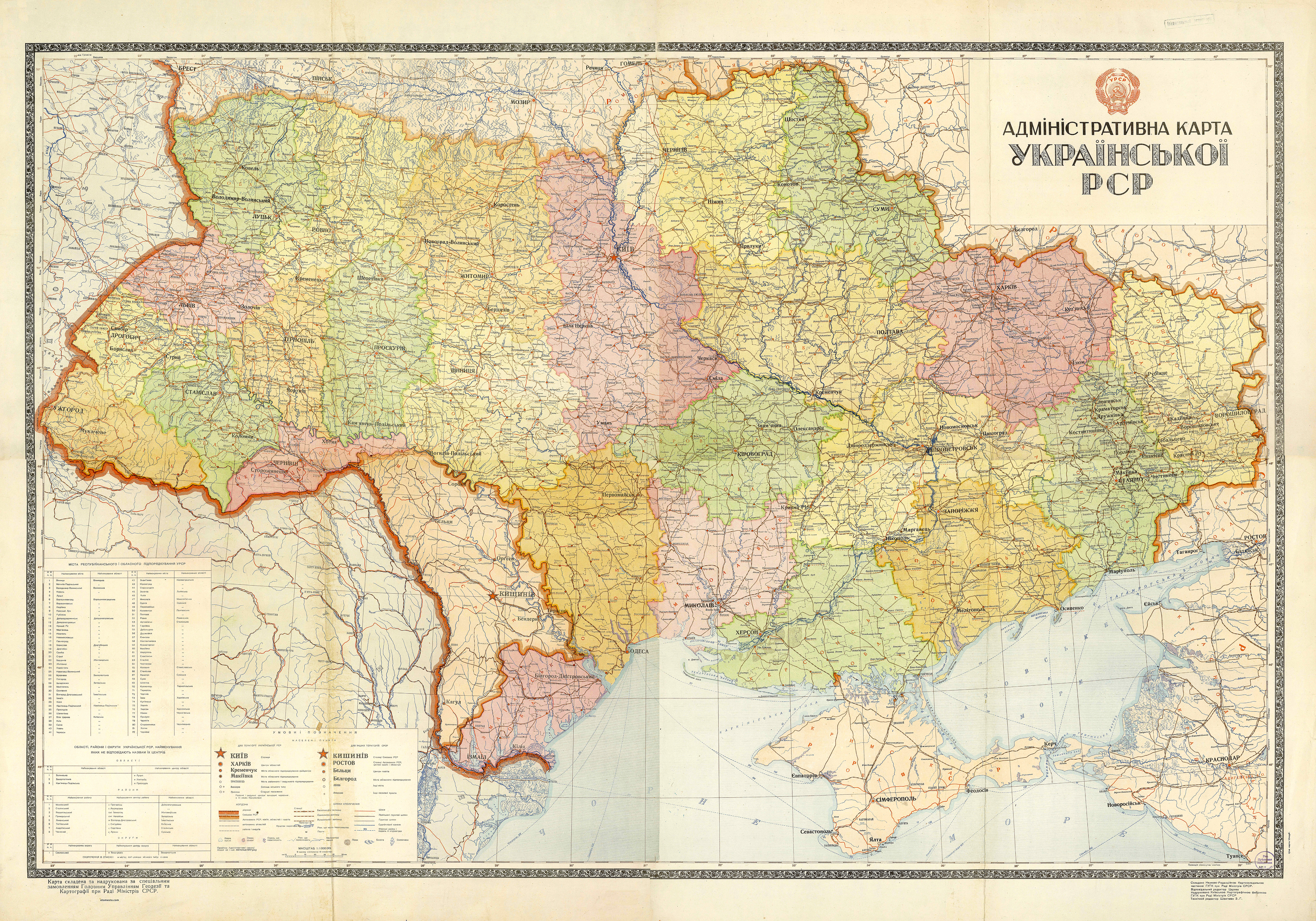
A 1947 map of Ukraine produced in the USSR by GUGK

SSPE "Kartographia" was originally established in 1944 as the Kyiv State Cartographic Factory of the Main Directorate of Geodesy and Cartography (GUGK) of the USSR.

=== History of renaming ===
On 1 November 1991, SSPE "Kartographia" was renamed as the Kyiv Science-Editorial Mapmaking Enterprise, as part of the State Cartographic and Geodesic Service of Ukraine. Between April 1993 and January 2001, it was known as the Scientific-Research and Experimental-Producing Enterprise "Kartographia", before becoming a state enterprise, and given its present name.

== Mission and activities ==
The SSPE "Kartographia"'s mission as Ukraine's national mapping agency and provider of cartographic products is defined by Ukrainian law. The mission involves supporting the work of state and government institutions, supporting educational institutions, assisting in the work of the Support Forces of the Armed Forces of Ukraine, and research work. The organisation's mission statement declares:

[Our mission is] to open up opportunities for leisure and travel, personal development and education, creating a variety of maps and atlases, ensuring their relevance, accuracy and accessibility. To encourage maps as one of the most important factors in the formation of worldview, self-improvement and self-realization, development of national culture and traditions.

The Kartographia took part in the international and local publishers exhibitions, forums, meetings and workshops as a guest, as well as a host.

In addition, the Kartographia also cooperates with many enterprises from various countries including Белкартография (Belarus, ceased), HarperCollins (Great Britain), Freytag & Berndt (Germany), ExpressMap (Poland), Didakta (Lithuania), Tecnodidattica (Italy), etc., and consults UN, OHCHR and other international institutions.

On 16 December 2013, the SSPE "Kartographia" published Historical-Cartographic Proofs of the Connections of the Crimea with Ukraine, which illustrated the history of Ukraine from the 30th century BC to the late 20th century. Following the 2014 Russian annexation of Crimea, the SSPE "Kartographia" republished the article, later releasing it as part of the series The United Country.

== Products ==
=== Education and training materials ===
External images
- Samples and reviews
- Topographic map 1:10 000 (2014)
- History Teacher's Atlas (2024)
- Ukraine new blank map (2024)
- World new blank map (2025)

Since 2000s, the Kartographia are worked on development of digital classes for Geography study in Ukrainian schools for offline and online use, initially basing on the Macromedia Flash Player technology.

Since 2020, due to the COVID-19 pandemic in Ukraine, continued with a further the Russia invasion of Ukraine on 24 February 2022 and country-wide missile and drone attacks by Russians (including attacks on educational institutions and schools), also sided with a massive migration of Ukrainians inside the country and an emigration from Ukraine (spreading the Ukrainian diaspora all around the globe), the Kartographia designed the E-Kartographia, an online digital education service, basing on its previous experience and modern Web technologies, primary intended for the use in primary and secondary schools inside Ukraine and in Ukrainian schools overseas. In 2025, the Kartographia released a case study paper on the use of E-Kartopgraphia in primary schools.

- Topographic maps and Topography handbooks: is an educational topographic paper maps set for the use in secondary schools and for army trainings. Revised edition published in 2023.
- New blank maps of Ukraine and the World: are a wall size blank maps for the use in schools, published in 2024 and 2025 accordingly, with an actual state of administrative borders, landscape and hydrography edges. Ukraine's hydrography on blank maps shows actual state of the Dnipro river in the area of the Kakhovka Reservoir, after the Destruction of the Kakhovka Dam and its totall collapse initiated by Russians in 2023.

Since the start of the 2022 invasion of Ukraine, the SSPE "Kartographia" designed a digital version of the Topographic map for in-class and remote use in schools and self education.

During the War, the Kartographia continued its research work and production of various maps on modern Geography and History of Ukraine and the World, launched the Interactive map of Ukraine, printed a set of educational topographic maps in paper. Since 2022, cartography themes were are: the War and History; the National and International Holidays; Ukrainian culture and Cultures of the World; Transport and Travels; The Universe and Space Exploration, etc.

=== Globes and atlases ===
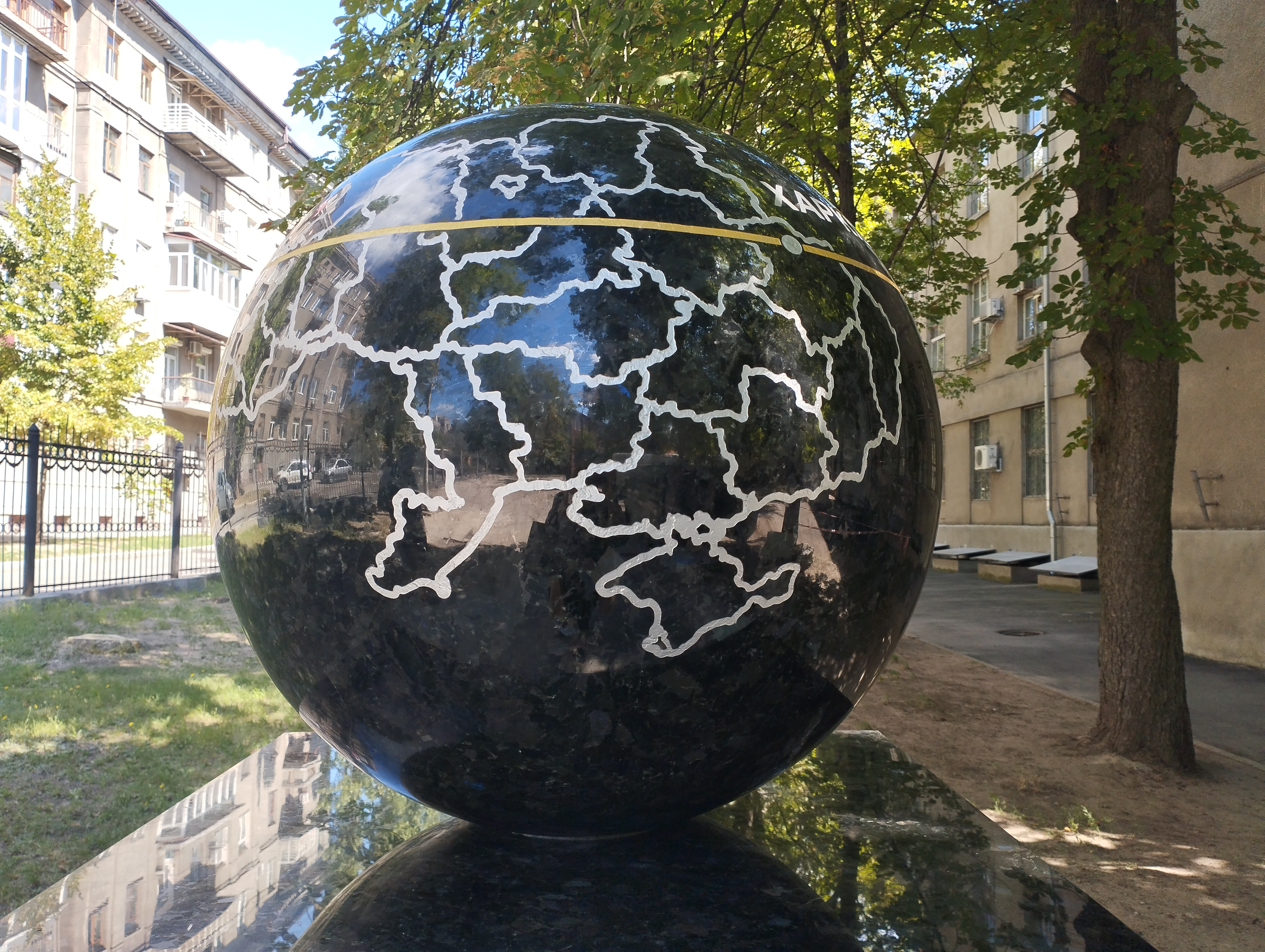
The 50th parallel north globe in Kharkiv

The SSPE "Kartographia" continued production and upgraded the Globe of Ukraine invented in 1997 by the State Enterprise "State Cartographic Factory". Since 2006, a revised edition has been produced as a souvenir. (Note: The Globe of Ukraine is the only pre-1990s anecdote, that become viral meme phrase since the 1990s and a real product since 1997, produced by the Kartographia for decades. The Globe of Ukraine as a phrase and graphics was a subject of Russian porpaganda since 1990, yet used in Russian media info wars while before 2014. Production of the real globe and use of phrase by Ukrainians is a part of Ukrainian folklore. Also, a Polish cartographic publisher the F.P.H. ZACHEM-GŁOWALA produced a similar looking the Globe of Poland (Globus Polski. Administracyjno-fizyczny ø 320mm), initially also a local meme and an object of folklore. In its non-propaganda meaning, the Globe of Ukraine phrase used in a context of all Ukrainians around the globe (a global national society, like any other national societies around the globe).)

The Comprehensive Atlas of Ukraine (2005) is a descriptive atlas of Ukraine in the 21st century. The National Atlas of Ukraine (2007) is a general atlas of Ukraine that is available on the official website of the Ukrainian Institute of Geography.

=== GIS software ===
In its initial years, the Kartographia used various professional tools for map creation, such as Descantes and MicroStation (Bentley Systems), MapPublisher (Intergraft), ArcView 3.x (Esri), Adobe FreeHand, etc. Some GIS software developed on its own, and sample data files provided for free. GIS database includes digital maps of all cities and towns of Ukraine (in a scale 1 : 10 000), and of Ukraine in whole in various scales (from 1 : 50 000 to 1 : 1 000 000).

Since the rise of the Geographic information system and GIS database paradigms, the Kartographia is an involved in development of GIS products.

== Membership of organisations ==
SSPE Kartographia is a member of the International Cartographic Association (ICA), the Ukrainian League of Industrialists and Entrepreneurs, the Ukrainian Geographical Society, the Kyiv Chamber of Commerce and Industry, the International Cartographic Trade Association, and the All-Ukrainian Association of Publishers and Book Distributors.

== Other Ukrainian map and chart producers ==
The Kartograpphia is not the only state-owned enterprises in the field of cartography in Ukraine, were there are dozen of various smaller institutions (civil land-use planning cartography is a property of the State Service of Ukraine for Geodesy, Cartography and Cadastre, nautical charts are property of Derzhydrographia, etc.; all of them are consulted or supported by the SSPE "Kartographia" according its statute and the Ukrainian laws). There are also few big private paper maps publishers in area of educational cartography in Ukraine, and Visicom Maps is the most relaible online maps service of Ukraine (used by Ukrainian Hydrometeorological Center, Ivan Fedorov Book Chamber of Ukraine et al.).

== See also ==
- Maps of Ukraine
- Cartography of Ukraine
