= Permanent Committee on Geographical Names (Germany) =

Scientific organization on geography

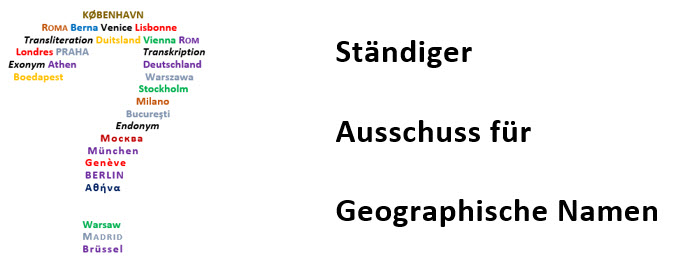
Committee's logo

Permanent Committee on Geographical Names (German: Ständiger Ausschuss für geographische Namen (StAGN)) is an independent scientific organization on the standardization of geographical names of German-speaking area. It is an independent scientific body based in Frankfurt am Main.

== Responsibilities and working methods ==
The central tasks of the Permanent Committee on Geographic Names include the recommendation, promotion, and development of rules for the consistent use of geographic names. These agendas were established in a set of rules in 1975, which were updated in 2010. The aim of the StAGN's activities is to standardize the official and private use of geographic names in the German-speaking area by issuing relevant recommendations and guidelines. The StAGN represents these recommendations and resolutions both domestically and internationally, participating in the development of geographic name lists that are in line with the recommendations of United Nations resolution for the standardization of geographic names. The publications produced by the StAGN and published on its website include regularly updated lists and recommendations for endonyms used in the German-speaking area, as well as exonyms of foreign state names used in the German-speaking world.

The office of the Permanent Committee on Geographic Names is located at the Federal Office for Cartography and Geodesy (BKG) in Frankfurt am Main. This federal specialized agency is primarily concerned with geographic names by its nature. Some of the committee's biannual meetings also take place there. Its permanent, non-permanent, and corresponding members are determined by election and work on a voluntary basis.

== Composition ==
The committee is composed of representatives from various institutions in the Federal Republic of Germany and other countries where the German language has official status, including:

1. Working group of the surveying authorities of the states of the Federal Republic of Germany (AdV)
2. Federal Foreign Office (AA)
3. Bibliographisches Institut & F. A. Brockhaus/Duden Editorial Office
4. Federal Ministry for Transport/Federal Maritime and Hydrographic Agency (BSH)
5. Federal Ministry of the Interior/Federal Agency for Cartography and Geodesy (BKG)
6. Federal Ministry of Defense/Center for Geoinformation of the German Armed Forces (ZGeoBw)
7. German Academy of Regional Studies
8. German National Library (DNB) and Berlin State Library
9. German Society for Geography (DGfG)
10. German Society for Cartography (DGfK)
11. German Institute for Standardisation Registered Association (DIN)
12. Gesellschaft für deutsche Sprache (GfdS)
13. Leibniz-Institut für Länderkunde (IfL)
14. Kultusministerkonferenz (KMK)
15. Federal Statistical Office of Germany
16. Association of Cartographic Publishers in Germany (VKViD)
17. Representatives of the German-speaking Community of Belgium
18. Representatives of Austrian institutions, including the Working Group for Cartographic toponymy (Arbeitsgemeinschaft für Kartographische Ortsnamenkunde, AKO)
19. Representatives of Swiss institutions, including the Federal Office of Topography (swisstopo) and representatives of Swiss name research
20. Representatives of South Tyrolean institutions

== History ==
In 1952, a working group on naming and name writing was established within the German Society for Cartography (DGfK) at the Institute for Regional Studies in Bad Godesberg. After the United Nations Group of Experts on Geographical Names (UNGEGN) was formed in 1959, the Permanent Committee for the Spelling of Geographic Names was established by the German Federal Ministry of the Interior, with its headquarters at the Institute for Regional Studies. In 1965, it was renamed the Permanent Committee on Geographic Names (StAGN). In 1973, the StAGN's office moved from the then Federal Research Institute for Regional Studies and Spatial Planning (Bonn-Bad Godesberg) to the Institute for Applied Geodesy (IfAG), the predecessor institution of the Federal Office for Cartography and Geodesy (BKG) in Frankfurt am Main.

In 1996, the 100th meeting of the StAGN was celebrated with an International Symposium on Geographic Names in Vienna. Its second edition, titled GeoNames 2000, took place in Frankfurt am Main in 2000. The following year, the StAGN hosted the international workshop GeoNames 2001 in Berchtesgaden. A year later, the StAGN organized the 8th United Nations Conference on the Standardization of Geographic Names in Berlin. The 50th anniversary of the StAGN was celebrated in 2009 with an event at the Polish Institute in Leipzig. In 2014, the first joint meeting between the Commissions on Geographic Names of Poland and the StAGN was held in Town Hall of Görlitz.

StAGN Chairpersons:

1. 1959–1976 Emil Meynen
2. 1976–1982 Josef Breu (concurrently Chair of UNGEGN)
3. 1982–1991 Herbert Liedtke
4. 1991–1994 Karl August Seel
5. 1994–2009 Jörn Sievers (concurrently Vice Chair of UNGEGN)
6. since 2009 Helge Paulig
