= Federal Agency for Cartography and Geodesy =

Federal agency in Germany

German Federal Archives
- German: Bundesamt für Kartographie und Geodäsie
- Logo

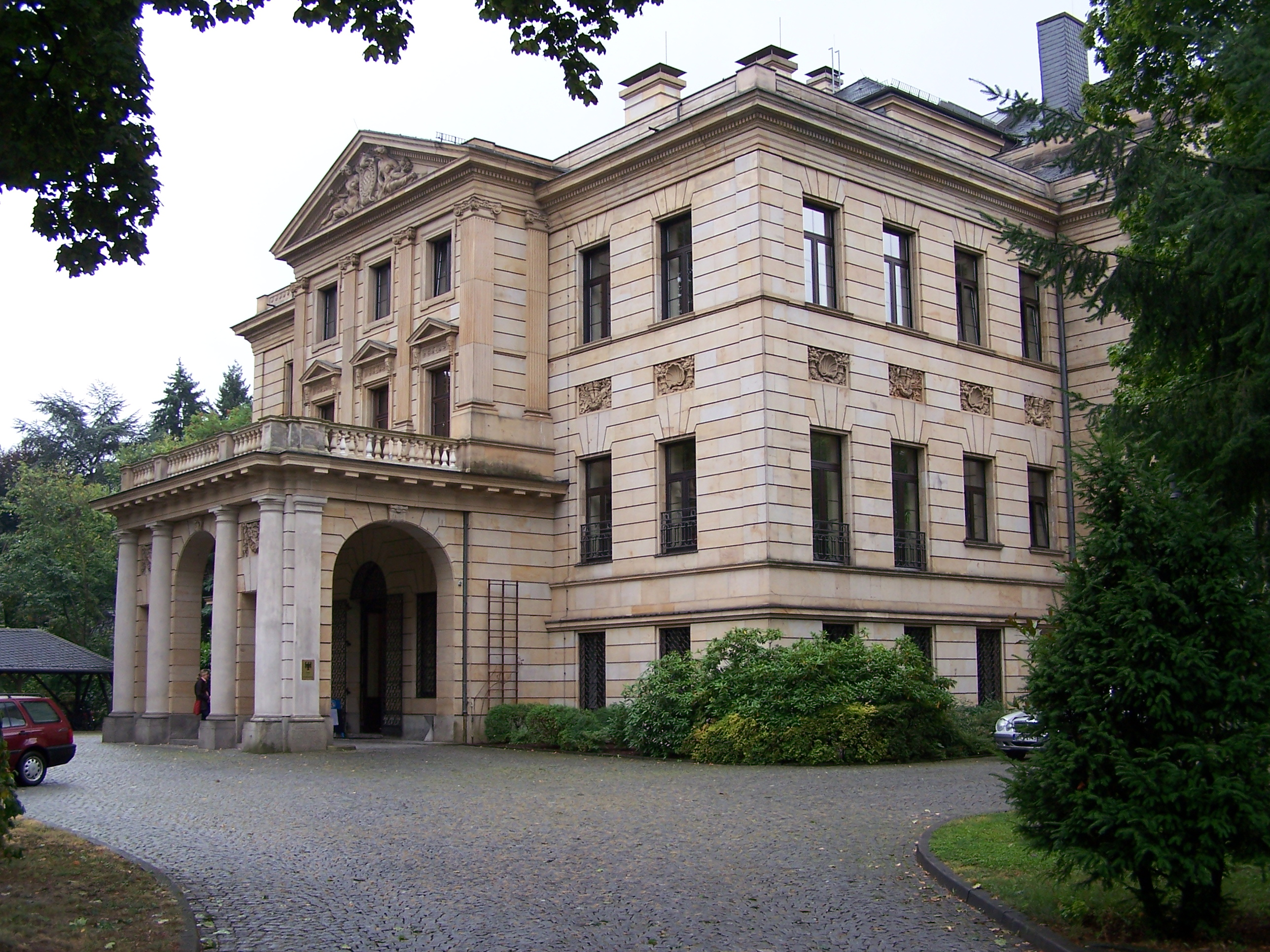
- BKG main office

Archive overview
- Formed: 4 August 1997 (28 years ago)
- Headquarters: Frankfurt am Main, Germany; 50°5′23″N 8°39′52″E
- Annual budget: 64,022 Mio. EUR (2024)
- Archive executive: Paul Becker
- Website: www.bkg.bund.de

The Federal Agency for Cartography and Geodesy (German: Bundesamt für Kartographie und Geodäsie, BKG) is Germany's national mapping agency. It is located in Frankfurt, with a branch in Leipzig. It operates the Geodetic Observatory Wettzell.

In July 2024, Germany summoned the Chinese ambassador over a 2021 cyber-attack against the Federal Agency for Cartography and Geodesy attributed to "Chinese state actors" for the "purpose of espionage."

== Tasks ==
The BKG has the following specific responsibilities:

- Preparation, updating, and provision of location- and spatial-based data for describing features on the Earth's surface
- Provision and maintenance of national, higher-level geodetic reference networks
- Participation in bilateral and multilateral efforts to establish and maintain global geodetic reference systems and networks
- Coordination of the development, expansion, and maintenance of the federal share of the geodata infrastructure for Germany
- Operation of a federal service center for geoinformation and geodesy
- Representation of Germany's professional interests at the European and international levels
- The BKG develops processes, products, and services that combine topographical geodata with thematic information from specialized information systems, thus making them usable.

In addition to its specialist work, the BKG contributes to coordinating geodesy and geoinformation within the German federal system. These include the Central Agency for Geotopography (ZSGT) and the Coordination Office of the German Geodata Infrastructure (GDI-DE). By coordinating the GDI-DE, the BKG also serves as the liaison office with the European Commission within the framework of the EU INSPIRE Directive, which requires all member states to provide public geoinformation online according to uniform professional and technical rules.

Until 2012, there was no legal basis at the federal level to establish terms of use for the provision of geodata and geodata services. Since the last amendment to the Geodata Access Act (GeoZG) came into force on November 16, 2012, federal geodata and geodata services have generally been available free of charge for commercial and non-commercial use.

Due to the technical proximity, the office of the Permanent Committee on Geographical Names and the administrative headquarters of the International Earth Rotation and Reference Systems Service are also located in the BKG.

== See also ==
- About BKG
