= Kadaster =

Dutch government agency

Service for the Cadastre and Public Registers
- Dienst voor het Kadaster en de Openbaare Registers
- Logo of the Dutch Government

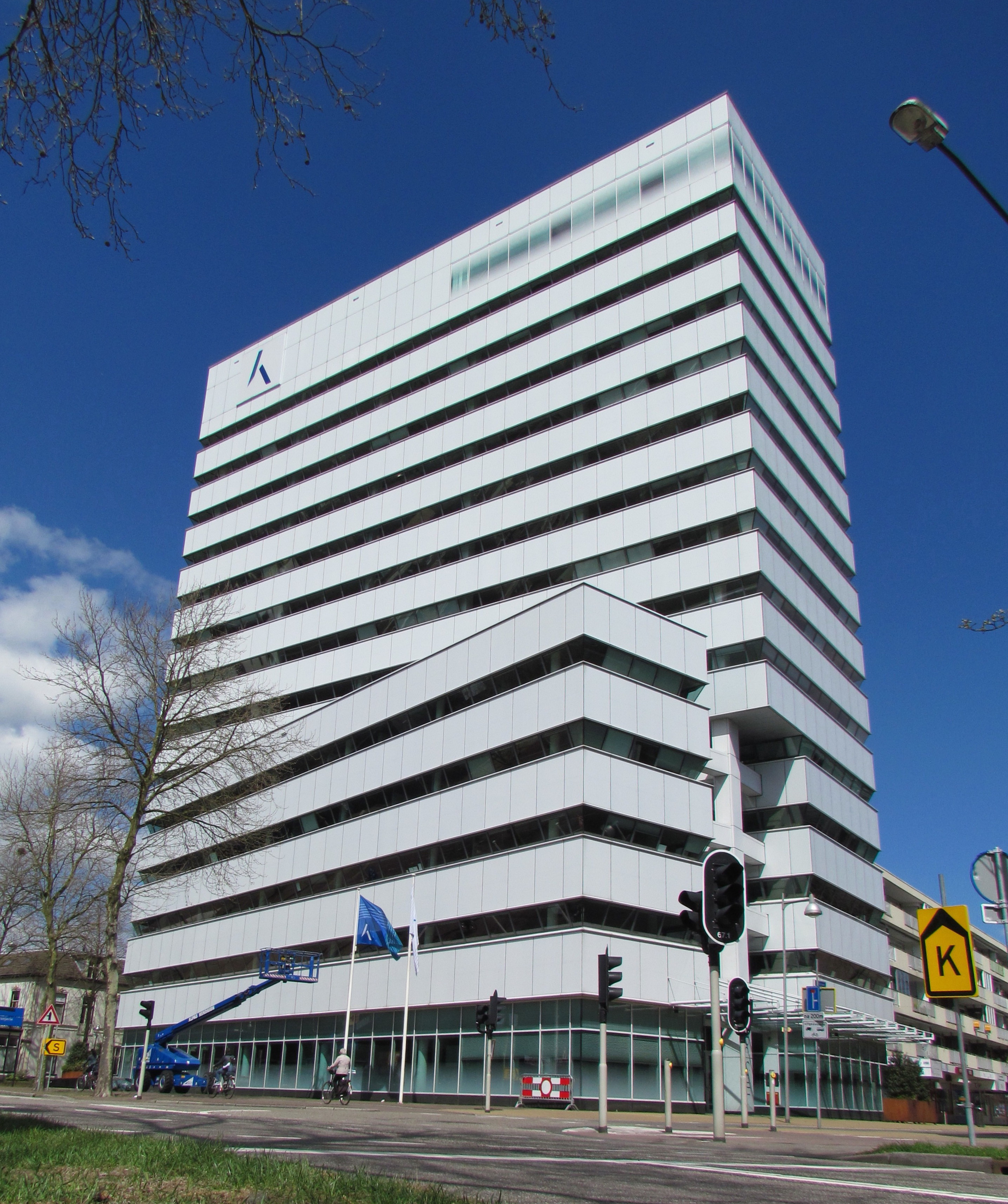
- The headquarters of Kadaster in Apeldoorn.

Agency overview
- Formed: 1 January 1832
- Jurisdiction: Government of the Netherlands
- Headquarters: Apeldoorn
- Motto: Het Kadaster. Rightfully yours.
- Employees: 1700
- Minister responsible: Mona Keijzer, Minister of Housing and Spatial Planning
- Agency executive: Frank Tierolff, Chair of the Board of Directors
- Parent department: Ministry of Housing and Spatial Planning
- Website: https://www.Kadaster.nl

Kadaster is the name designation of the Dutch Cadastre, Land Registry and national mapping agency in the Netherlands. The word Kadaster comes from the medieval Latin catastrum, descended from either the Greek καταστιχον (kata acrostic), frame, or the Latin capitatrastum (head), a Roman head tax based on property ownership.

Kadaster is the responsibility of the Ministry of Housing and Spatial Planning. The headquarters of the agency is located in Apeldoorn.
