= Chief Directorate: National Geo-spatial Information =

National mapping agency of South Africa

Agency overview
- Formed: 1920; 106 years ago
- Preceding agency: Trigonometrical Survey of South Africa
- Type: Chief Directorate
- Jurisdiction: Government of South Africa
- Headquarters: Van der Sterr Building, Rhodes Avenue, Mowbray, Cape Town; 33°57′5″S 18°28′7″E
- Annual budget: R72,044,000
- Minister responsible: Thoko Didiza, Minister of Agriculture, Land Reform and Rural Development
- Agency executive: Mr. Aslam Parker, Chief Director
- Parent agency: Department of Agriculture, Land Reform and Rural Development
- Website: ngi.dalrrd.gov.za

The Chief Directorate: National Geo-spatial Information or CD:NGI (formerly the Chief Directorate: Surveys and Mapping or CD:SM), is the national mapping agency of South Africa. It is part of the Department of Agriculture, Land Reform and Rural Development.
