= National mapping agency =

Organisation that produces maps and geographic information of a country

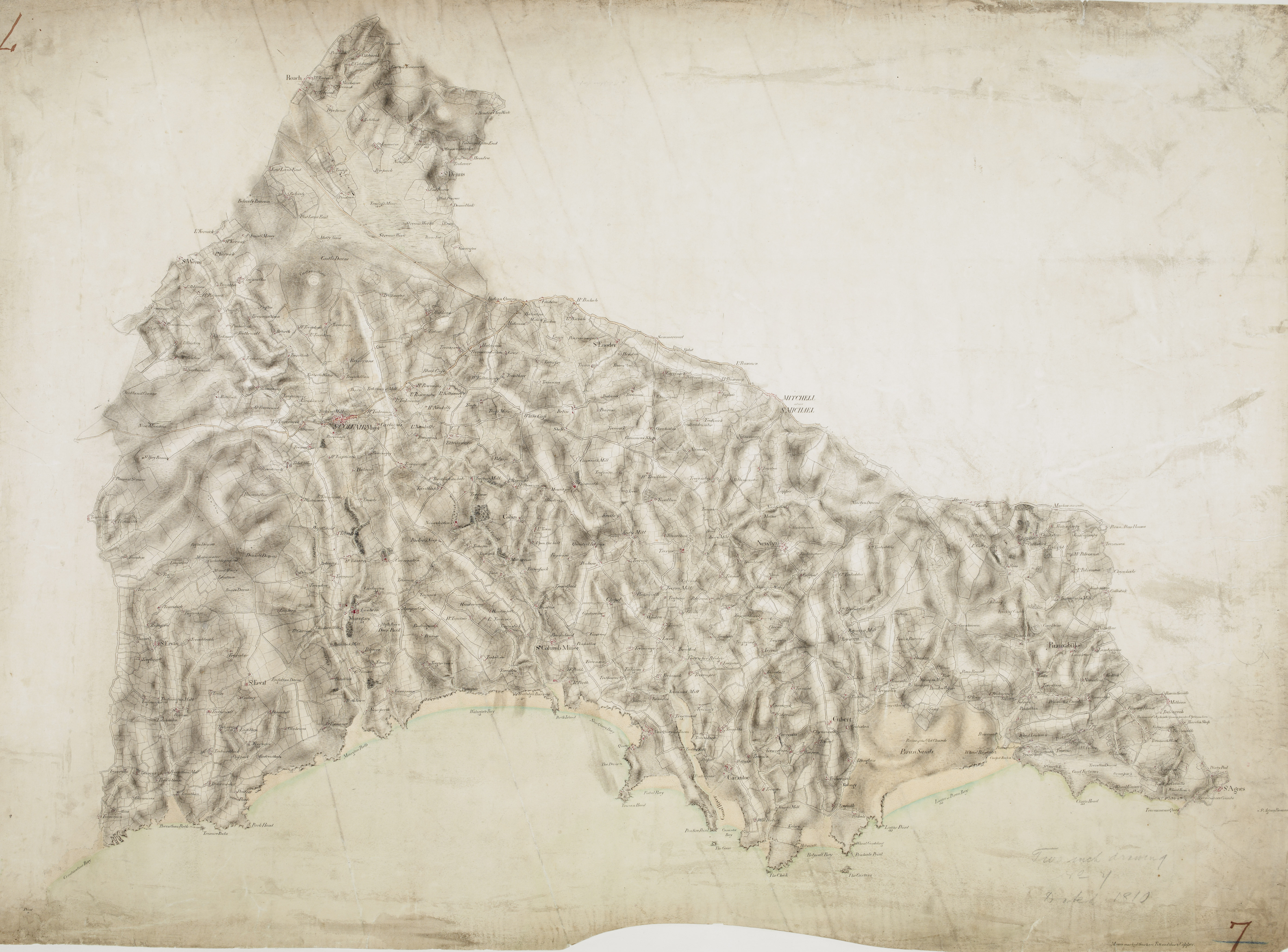
The original draftsman's drawings for the area around St. Columb Major, Cornwall, made in 1810.

A national mapping agency (NMA) is an organisation, usually publicly owned, that produces topographic maps and geographic information of a country. Some national mapping agencies also deal with cadastral matters.

According to 2007/2/EC European directive, national mapping agencies of European Union countries must have publicly available services for searching, viewing and downloading their spatial data. Maps produced by some of them are available under a free license that allows re-use, such as a Creative Commons license.

== List ==
For an overview of national mapping agencies, see the List of national mapping agencies.

Many of these agencies developed themselves through time into an national mapping and cadastral authority (NMCA) and nowadays into an national mapping and geospatial information agency (NMGA).

== History ==
=== Ordnance Survey ===
The first national mapping agency was the Ordnance Survey in the United Kingdom; its roots go back to 1747, when the compilation of a map of the Scottish Highlands was proposed. This survey at a scale of 1 inch to 1000 yards (1:36,000) was the starting point of the Principal Triangulation of Great Britain (1783–1853), and led to the creation of the Ordnance Survey itself; work was begun in earnest in 1790, when the Board of Ordnance began a national military survey at one-inch-to-the-mile (1:63,360 scale). During the next thirty years, roughly a third of England and Wales was mapped (see Principal Triangulation of Great Britain), as other military matters took precedence.

== Discussion ==
Although virtually the entire terrestrial surface of Earth has been mapped at scale 1:1,000,000, medium and large-scale mapping has been accomplished intensively in some countries and much less in others. Nevertheless, national mapping programs listed below are only a partial selection. Several commercial vendors supply international topographic map series.

=== Australia ===
The NMIG (National Mapping Information Group) of Geoscience Australia is the Australian Government's national mapping agency. It provides topographic maps and data to meet the needs of the sustainable development of the nation. The Office of Spatial Data Management provides an online free map service MapConnect. These topographic maps of scales 1:250,000 and 1:100,000 are available in printed form from the Sales Centre. 1:50,000 and 1:25,000 maps are produced in conjunction with the Department of Defence.

=== Austria ===
Austrian Maps (German: Österreichische Karte (ÖK)) is the government agency producing maps of Austria, which are distributed by Bundesamt für Eich- und Vermessungswesen (BEV) in Vienna. The maps are published at scales 1:25,000 1:50,000 1:200,000 and 1:500,000. Maps can also be viewed online.

=== Canada ===
The Centre for Topographic Information produces topographic maps of Canada at scales of 1:50,000 and 1:250,000. The full map catalogue is known as the National Topographic System (NTS). A government proposal to discontinue publishing of all hardcopy or paper topographic maps in favor of digital-only mapping data was shelved in 2005 after intense public opposition.

Some provinces, like Quebec, produce higher scale (1:20,000) maps of their territory

=== China ===
The State Bureau of Surveying and Cartography compiles topographic maps at 1:25,000 and 1:50,000 scales. It is reported that these maps are accurate and attractively printed in seven colors, and that successive editions show progressive improvement in accuracy.

These large-scale maps are the basis for maps at smaller scales. Maps at scales 1:4,000,000 or smaller are exported by Cartographic Publishing House, Beijing while larger-scale maps are restricted as state secrets, and prohibited from publishing by legislation, all except Hong Kong and Macau. China's topographic maps follow the international system of subdivision with 1:100,000 maps spanning 30 minutes longitude by 20 minutes latitude.

=== Colombia ===
The Geographic Institute Agustín Codazzi is the government entity responsible for producing and distributing topographic maps of Colombia in 1:500,000 and 1:100,000 scales. These and several other Geographic information services can be accessed using the Instituto Geográfico Agustin Codazzi website in Spanish.

=== Denmark ===
The National Survey and Cadastre of Denmark is responsible for producing topographic and nautical geodata of Denmark, Greenland and the Faroe Islands.

=== Finland ===
The National Land Survey of Finland produces the Topographic Database (accuracy 1:5000-1:10 000) and publishes topographic maps of Finland at 1:25,000 and 1:50,000. In addition topographics maps can be viewed by using a free map service MapSite.

=== France ===
The Institut Géographique National (IGN) produces topographic maps of France at 1:25,000 and 1:50,000. In addition, topographic maps are freely accessible online, through the Géoportail website.

=== Germany ===
In principle, each federal state (Bundesland) is in charge of producing the official topographic maps. In fact, the maps between 1:5,000 and 1:100,000 are produced and published by the land surveying offices of each federal state, the maps between 1:200,000 and 1:1,000,000 by a federal house – the Bundesamt für Kartographie und Geodäsie (BKG) in Frankfurt am Main.

=== Greece ===
Topographic maps for general use are available at 1:50,000 and 1:100,000 from the Hellenic Military Geographical Service (HMGS). They use a national projection system called EGSA'87, which is a Transverse Mercatorial Projection mapping Greece in one zone. A few areas are also available at 1:25,000. Some private firms sell topographic maps of national parks based on HMGS topography.

=== Hong Kong ===
The Department of Lands is the government agency responsible for surveying and publishing topographic maps of Hong Kong. Commonly used maps such as the HM20C series (1:20,000) are reviewed and updated every year or two. Very large scale (1:600 in Urban area and the 1:1,000 HM1C series for all of HK) topographic maps are also available to public for various uses.

=== Iceland ===
The National Science Institute of Iceland is the government agency responsible for mapping, geodesy and producing topographic data for Iceland. They maintain the local ISN2016 EPSG:8088 and EPSG:8086 map projection for Iceland.

=== India ===
The Survey of India is responsible for all topographic control, surveys and mapping of India.

=== Israel ===
The Survey of Israel is responsible for the civilian mapping of Israel. Standard map scales are 1:50,000 and 1:100,000. The 1:50,000 map is available online.

The Military Intelligence Directorate of the Israel Defense Forces has its own mapping unit, which is a sub-unit of Unit 9900.

=== Japan ===
The Geographical Survey Institute of Japan is responsible for base mapping of Japan. Standard map scales are 1:25,000, 1:50,000, 1:200,000 and 1:500,000.

=== Nepal ===
From 1992 to 2000 a definitive series of large scale topographic maps were surveyed and published through a joint project by Government of Nepal Survey Department and Finland's Ministry for Foreign Affairs contracting through the FinnMap consulting firm. Japan International Cooperation Agency substituted for FinnMap in Lumbini Zone.

Topographic sheets at 1:25,000 scale covering 7.5 minutes latitude and longitude map the densely populatedTerai and Middle Mountain regions. Less populated high mountain regions are on 15-minute sheets at 1:50,000. JPG scans can be downloaded. Currently, Survey Department is updating its topographical base map using ZY-3 imagery. The first update phase completed 208 sheets

=== Netherlands ===
The Land Registry Kadaster (formerly Topografische Dienst) collects, processes and provides topographical information of the entire Dutch territory. The history of the Land Registry goes back to the year 1815, that year was commissioned to create a large map, known as Map of Krayenhoff. Around 1836 they began printing the topographic map on a scale of 1: 50,000, followed in 1865 by the topographic map on a scale of 1: 25,000. In 1951 began the start of production of the topographic map on a scale of 1: 10,000. From various reorganizations arose in 1932 the Topografische Dienst as national mapping agency of the Netherlands, since January 2004 housed within the Land Registry Kadaster.

=== New Zealand ===
Land Information New Zealand is the government agency responsible for providing up-to-date topographic mapping. LINZ topographic maps cover all of New Zealand, offshore islands, some Pacific Islands and the Ross Sea Region. The standard issue NZTopo map series was published September 2009 at 1:50,000 (NZTopo50), and 1:250,000 (NZTopo250). Vector data from the New Zealand Topographic Database (NZTopo) is also available.

=== Pakistan ===
The responsibility for topographic mapping and aerial photography lies with the Surveyor General of Pakistan [SGP]. Established in 1947, the Survey of Pakistan (SOP) is based in Rawalpindi with a number of regional offices distributed at urban centers throughout Pakistan. SGP is a civil organization which, for security reasons, is headed by a Surveyor General and works under the strict control of Army General Headquarters (GHQ). Colonel C.A.K. Innes-Wilson, a Royal Engineers officer who joined the Survey of India which mapped the subcontinent, was the first Surveyor General of Pakistan.

All departments which require topographic maps make their request to SGP and many are permanently registered with it for mapping and aerial photographs procurement. The SOP performs these functions under the auspices of the Ministry of Defence (MOD). Organisationally, the SOP is overseen by the Surveyor General (SG) who is a direct military appointee and a senior uniformed officer. The SG reports directly to the Secretary of Defence. Under the SG are two Deputy SG's (I and II) who manage the operational departments of the agency and a Senior Technical Advisor. These departments are divided into Regional Directorates for Topographic Mapping including the Northern region centred in Peshawar, Eastern region (Lahore), Western region (Quetta) and finally, the Southern region in Karachi. Responsibility for fields surveys and the maintenance/update of topographic maps are sub-divided according to these geographic areas.

=== Peru ===
The National Geographic Institute is in charge of the elaboration of the official maps of the country and to support activities related to its development and defense.

=== Portugal ===
The Army's Geographical Institute – Instituto Geográfico do Exército – produces 1.25,000, 1:500,000 maps for public sale, as well as many geographical services.

=== Romania ===
Until recently, the two major government mapping authorities in Romania have been the Military Topographic Department (Directia Topografica Militara (DTM)), and the Institute for Geodesy, Photogrammetry, Cartography and Land Management (Institutul de Geodezie, Fotogrammetrie, Cartografie, si Organizarea Teritoriului (IGFCOT)). This situation has recently changed, following a decision in 1996 by the Romanian Government to establish a combined civilian National Office of Cadastre, Geodesy and Cartography (Oficiul National de Cadastru, Geodezie si Cartografie) (ONCGC). Maps continued to be published under the imprint of the previous organizations into the late 1990s. From 1958, a number of town maps at scales of 1:5,000 or 1:10,000 were also made, initially on the Gauss-Krϋger projection, but after 1970 on a stereographic projection. More than 100 such sheets have been produced. There is also a street map of Bucharest in four sheets at 1:15,000 derived from larger-scale surveys, which is revised annually.

The 1:50,000 series in 737 sheets is now regarded as the base map. It was revised in the period 1965–72 using aerial photographs, and is currently being updated again with the intention of establishing a revision cycle of five to six years. The 1:25,000 will be retained, but revision only at 15-20-year intervals, except for sheets covering areas of rapid change.

=== Russia ===
Detailed, accurate topographic maps have long been a military priority. They are currently produced by the Military-topographic service of armed forces of the Russian Federation (Russian: Военно-топографическая служба Вооружённых сил Российской Федерации or ВТС ВС). Military topographic mapping departments held other titles in the Russian Empire since 1793 and in the Soviet Union where these maps also came to be used for internal control and economic development.

The Soviet Union conducted the world's most comprehensive cartographic project of the twentieth century. Soviet map sheets adopted the global sheet nomenclature of the International Map of the World system and already covered foreign territories by 1938. When Germany invaded in 1941, detailed maps from the USSR's western borders to the Volga River became an urgent task, accomplished in less than one year. After the war years the entire Soviet Union was mapped at scales down to 1:25,000—even 1:10,000 for the agriculturally productive fraction. The rest of the world except Antarctica is believed to have been mapped at scales down to 1:200,000, with regions of special interest down to 1:50,000 and many urban areas to 1:10,000. In all there may have been over one million map sheets of high quality and detail. Soviet maps were also notable for their consistent global indexing system. These advantages held for Soviet military maps of other countries, although there were some errors due to faulty intelligence.

Soviet maps for domestic civilian purposes were often of lower quality. From 1919 to 1967 they were produced by Head geodesic administration (Russian: Высшее геодезическое управление or ВГУ), then by Chief administration of geodesy and cartography (Russian: Главное управление геодезии и картографии or ГУГК). Now (June 2011) civilian maps are produced by the Federal agency for geodesy and cartography (Russian: Федеральное агентство геодезии и картографии or Роскартография).

Soviet military maps were state secrets. After the 1991 breakup of the Soviet Union, many maps leaked into the public domain. Map scales 1:100.000–1:500.000 can be viewed online.

=== Spain ===
The Instituto Geográfico Nacional (IGN) is responsible for the official topographic maps. It does use six scales that cover all the Spanish territory: 1:25,000 (map series called MTN25), 1:50,000 (map series called MTN50), 1:200,000, 1:500,000, 1:1,000,000 and 1:2,000,000. The most common scale is the first one, which utilizes the UTM system.

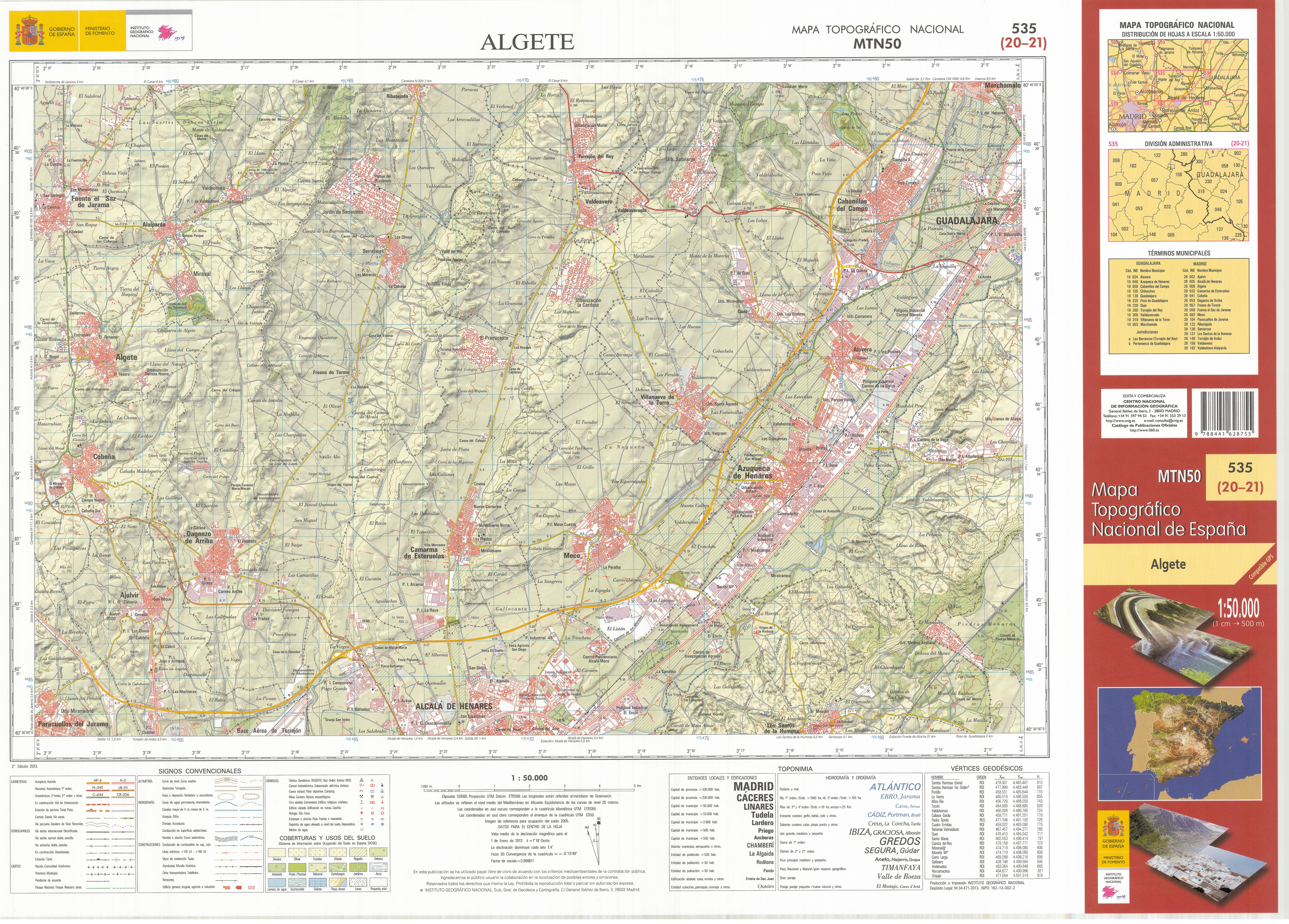
Sheet #535 (2013 version; second digital edition) of MTN50 Spanish National Topographic map series, covering Algete town (near Madrid) and its surroundings.

=== South Africa ===
The Chief Directorate: National Geo-spatial Information (CD:NGI) produces three topographic map series, each covering the whole country, at scales 1:50 000, 1:250 000, and 1:500 000.

=== Switzerland ===
Swisstopo (the Federal Office of Topography) produces topographic maps of Switzerland at seven different scales.

=== Taiwan ===
Topographic maps for Taiwan had long been kept as confidential information due to security concerns. It has only been recently made available to public from the National Land Surveying and Mapping Center, the government agency responsible for surveying and publishing various maps. Topographic maps of up to 1:25,000 is now available in digital and printed format.

=== Ukraine ===
The SSPE "Kartographia" is the National mapping agency in a form of the State enterprise of Ukraine, serves as the National member of the International Cartographic Association (ICA). They produces all the types of cartographic products for educational purposes and general use (topo maps at 1:10,000 and up to 1:1,000,000, tour guides and city maps of all types, including paper and digital maps, atlases, globes, GIS products, virtual classes for schools, etc.), covering the area of Ukraine and all the globe (maps for selected regions, such as France, Africa and World Political Map awarded by ICA). Also, they are managing organization of the State cartographo-geodesic fund of Ukraine, supporters of all the State enterprises and institutions in the field of cartography, and provides consulting services for the international organizations, such as UN, OSCE, OHCHR, etc.

In 2024, the Kartographia celebrated its 80th Anniversary. Long-term cooperation established with HarperCollins (UK), Freytag & Berndt (Germany), ExpressMap (Poland), Didakta (Lithuania), Tecnodidattica (Italy), and other publishers and resellers.

Ukraine administrative map, in a part based on SSPE “Kartographia” GIS data

=== United Kingdom ===
The Ordnance Survey (OS) produces topographic map series covering Great Britain at 1:25,000 and 1:50,000 scales. The 1:25,000 scale is known as the "Explorer" series, and include an "OL" (Outdoor Leisure) sub-series for areas of special interest to hikers and walkers. It replaced the "Pathfinder" series, which was less colourful and covered a smaller area on each map. The 1:50,000 scale is known as the "Landranger" and carries a distinctive pink cover. More detailed mapping as fine as 1:10,000 covers some parts of the country. The 1:25,000 and 1:50,000 scales are easily coordinated with standard romer scales on currently available compasses and plotting tools. The Ordnance Survey maintains a mapping database from which they can print specialist maps at virtually any scale.

The Ordnance Survey National Grid divides Great Britain into cells 500 km, 100 km, 10 km and 1 km square on a Transverse Mercator grid aligned true north–south along the 2°W meridian. OS map products are based on this grid.

=== United States ===
The United States Geological Survey (USGS), a scientific federal agency, has produced several national series of topographic maps which vary in scale and extent. The largest (both in terms of scale and quantity) topographic series is the 7.5-minute or 1:24,000 quadrangle. This scale is unique to the United States, where nearly every other developed nation has introduced a metric 1:25,000 or 1:50,000 large scale topo map, although the USGS has published 1:25,000 quadrangles. The USGS has also published 15-minute 1:62,500 maps, 1:100,000 maps covering 30 minutes latitude by one degree longitude, 1:250,000 covering one by two degrees, and state maps at 1:500,000 with California, Michigan and Montana needing two sheets while Texas has four. Alaska is mapped on a single sheet, at scales ranging from 1:1,584,000 to 1:12,000,000.

The replacement USGS digital The National Map omits several important geographic details that were featured in the original USGS topographic map series (1945–1992). Examples of omitted details and features include power transmission lines, telephone lines, railroads, recreational trails, pipelines, survey marks, and buildings. For many of these feature classes, the USGS is working with other agencies to develop data or adapt existing data on missing details that will be included in The National Map. In other areas USGS digital map revisions may omit geographic features such as ruins, mine locations, springs, wells, and even trails in an effort to protect natural resources and the public at large, or because such features are not present in any public domain database.

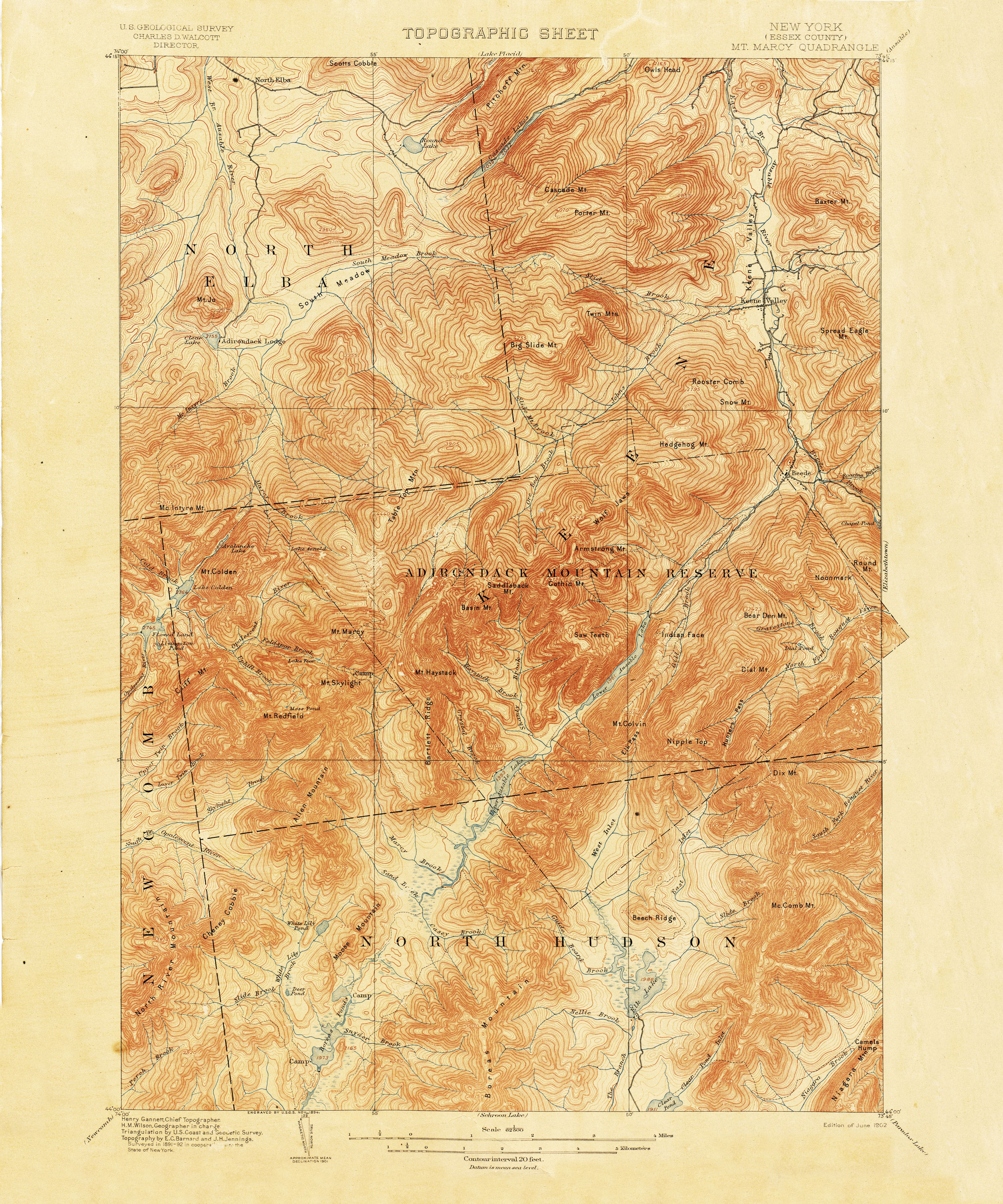
The Mount Marcy area of New York State in 1892 in a 15-minute quadrangle at 1:62,500.

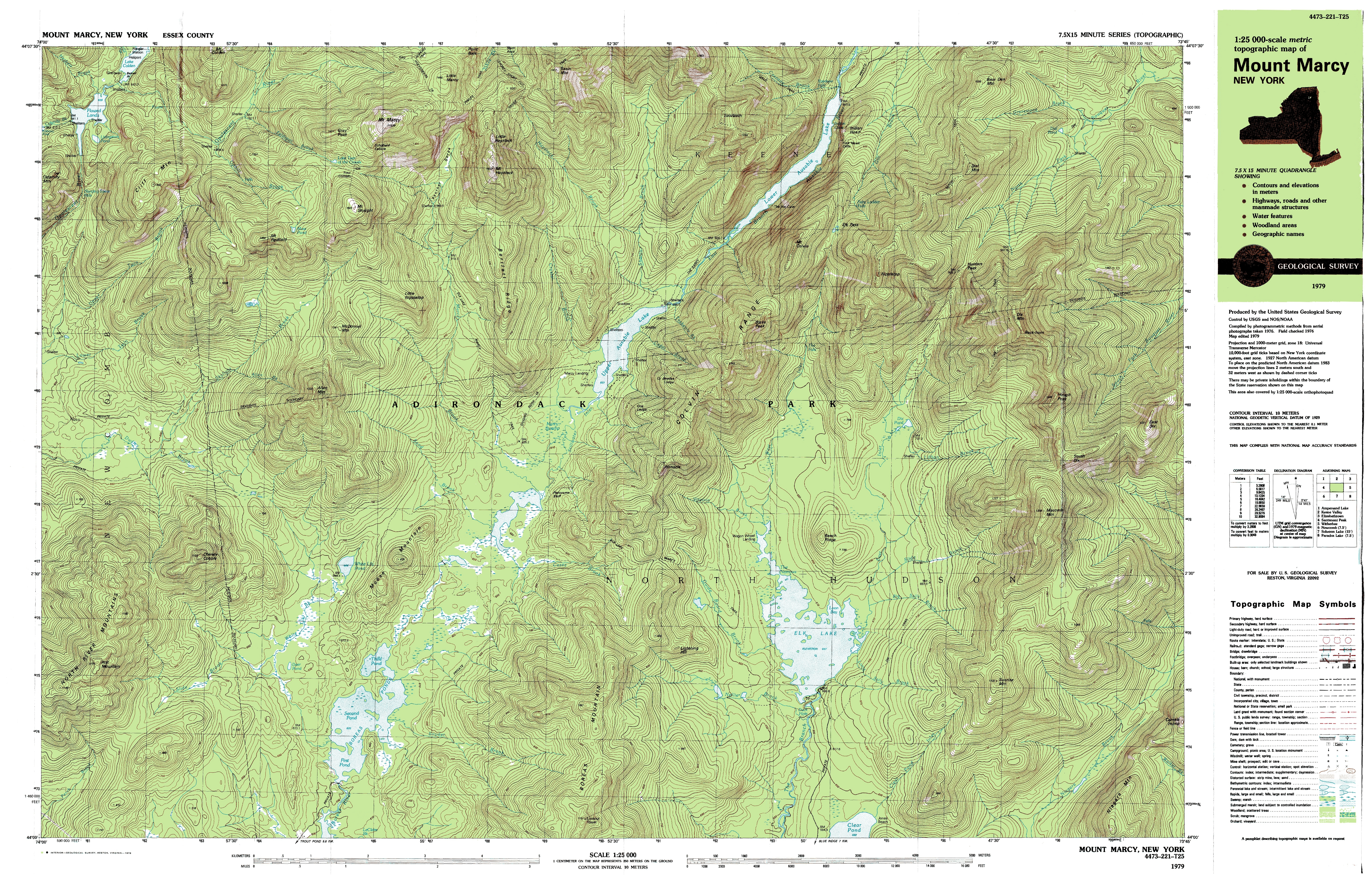
The southern half of same area about a century later (1979) in a 7.5- by 15-minute metric map at 1:25,000.

== See also ==
- Surveying
- Cartography
- Spatial data infrastructure
- United Nations Committee of Experts on Global Geospatial Information Management (UN-GGIM)
