= Nicolò D'Amico =

Italian academic and astrophysicist (1953–2020)

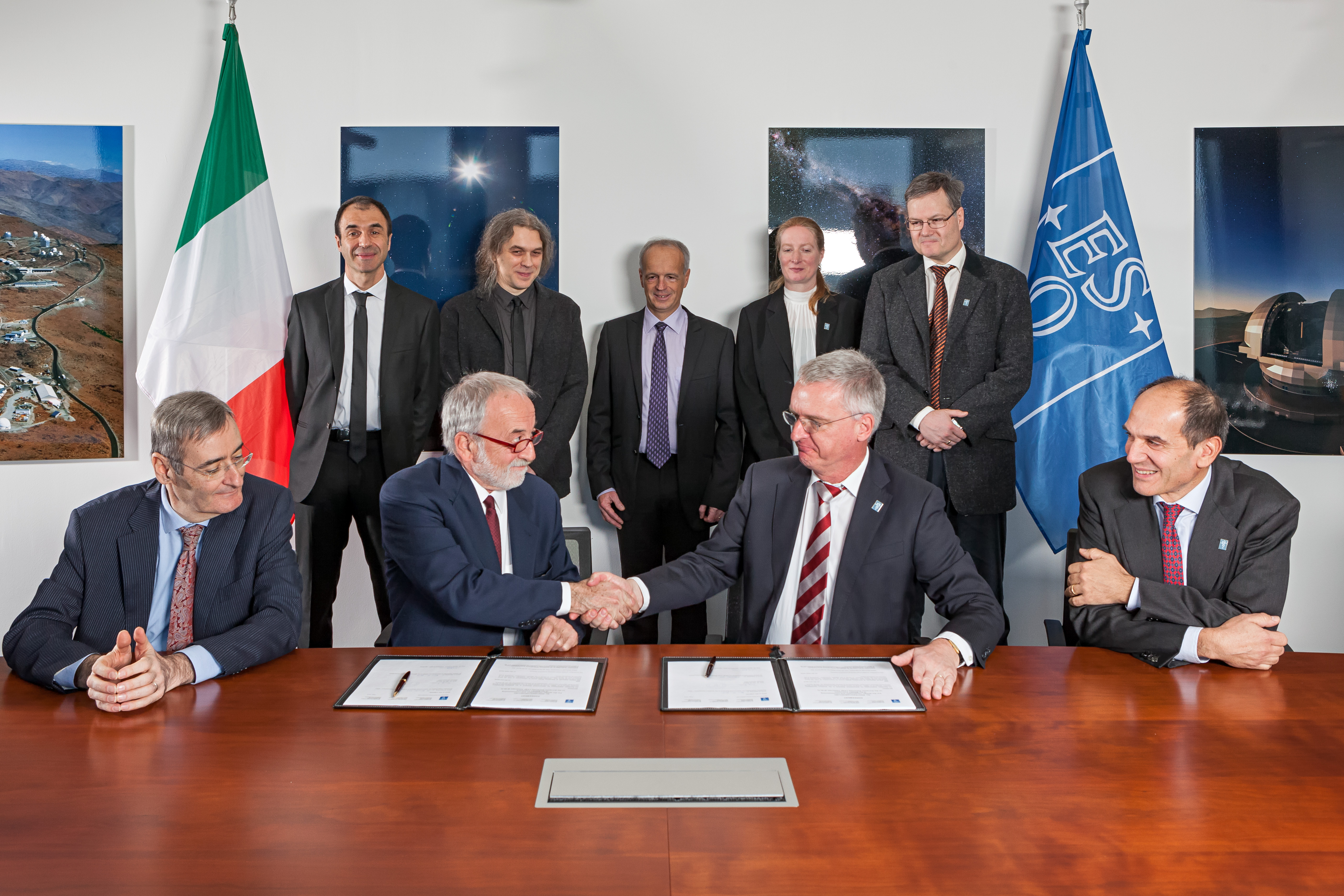
- Nicolò (front centre left) at an ESO signing event
- Born: 28 June 1953; Palermo
- Died: 15 September 2020 (aged 67); Cagliari
- Academic career
- Institutions: University of Cagliari
- Position held: president (2015–2020), director, director

Nicolò D'Amico (1953-2020), also known as Nichi D’Amico, was an astronomer and President of Istituto Nazionale di Astrofisica.

== Personal life ==
He was born on 28 June 1953 in Palermo. He was married and had a daughter. He died on 15 September 2020 in Cagliari.

== Career ==
He was a professor of astrophysics at the University of Cagliari, and the director of the Cagliari Observatory and the Sardinia Radio Telescope. He was the president of Istituto Nazionale di Astrofisica since 16 October 2015, with a second 4-year term confirmed on 30 December 2019.
