= Istituto di Radioastronomia di Bologna =

Italian research facility

Coordinates: 44.5221°N 11.3384°E

The Istituto di Radioastronomia di Bologna (Institute for Radio Astronomy of Bologna) is one of research facilities of the Italian Istituto Nazionale di Astrofisica (National Institute for Astrophysics). Staff conduct research in astronomy, physics, engineering and information science. It was previously part of the Consiglio Nazionale delle Ricerche (CNR; National Research Council).

The institute manages three instruments: two parabolic aerials built by CNR and the radio telescope Croce del Nord (Northern Cross) built by the University of Bologna and inaugurated in 1964.

The institute also operates on:

- the Medicina Radio Observatory and the VLBI aerial in Medicina, Emilia-Romagna.
- the Noto Radio Observatory in Noto, Sicily
- The Sardinia Radio Telescope (SRT) in Sardinia.
