= Sardinia Radio Telescope =

Radio telescope

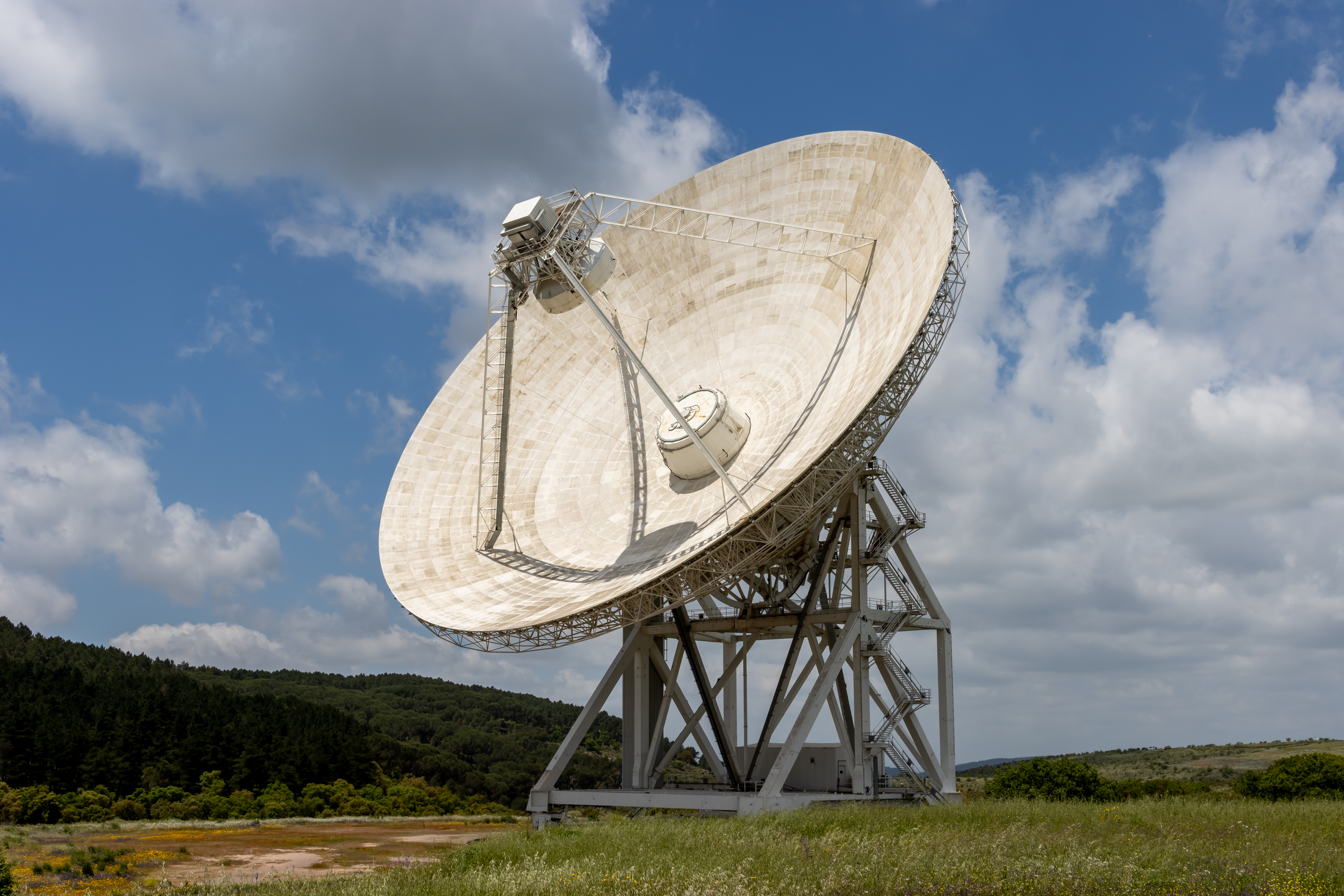
- Alternative names: SRT
- Location: San Basilio, Province of Cagliari, Sardinia, Italy
- Coordinates: 39°29′34″N 9°14′42″E
- Altitude: 600 m (2,000 ft)
- First light: 8 August 2012
- Diameter: 64 m (210 ft 0 in)
- Secondary diameter: 7.9 m (25 ft 11 in)
- Mass: 3,300 t (3,300,000 kg)
- Website: www.srt.inaf.it
- Location within Italy
- Related media on Commons

The Sardinia Radio Telescope (SRT) is 64-metre fully steerable radio telescope near San Basilio, Province of Cagliari, Sardinia, Italy. Completed in 2011, it is a collaboration between the Istituto di Radioastronomia di Bologna, the Cagliari Observatory (Cagliari) and the Arcetri Astrophysical Observatory (Florence).

== Design ==
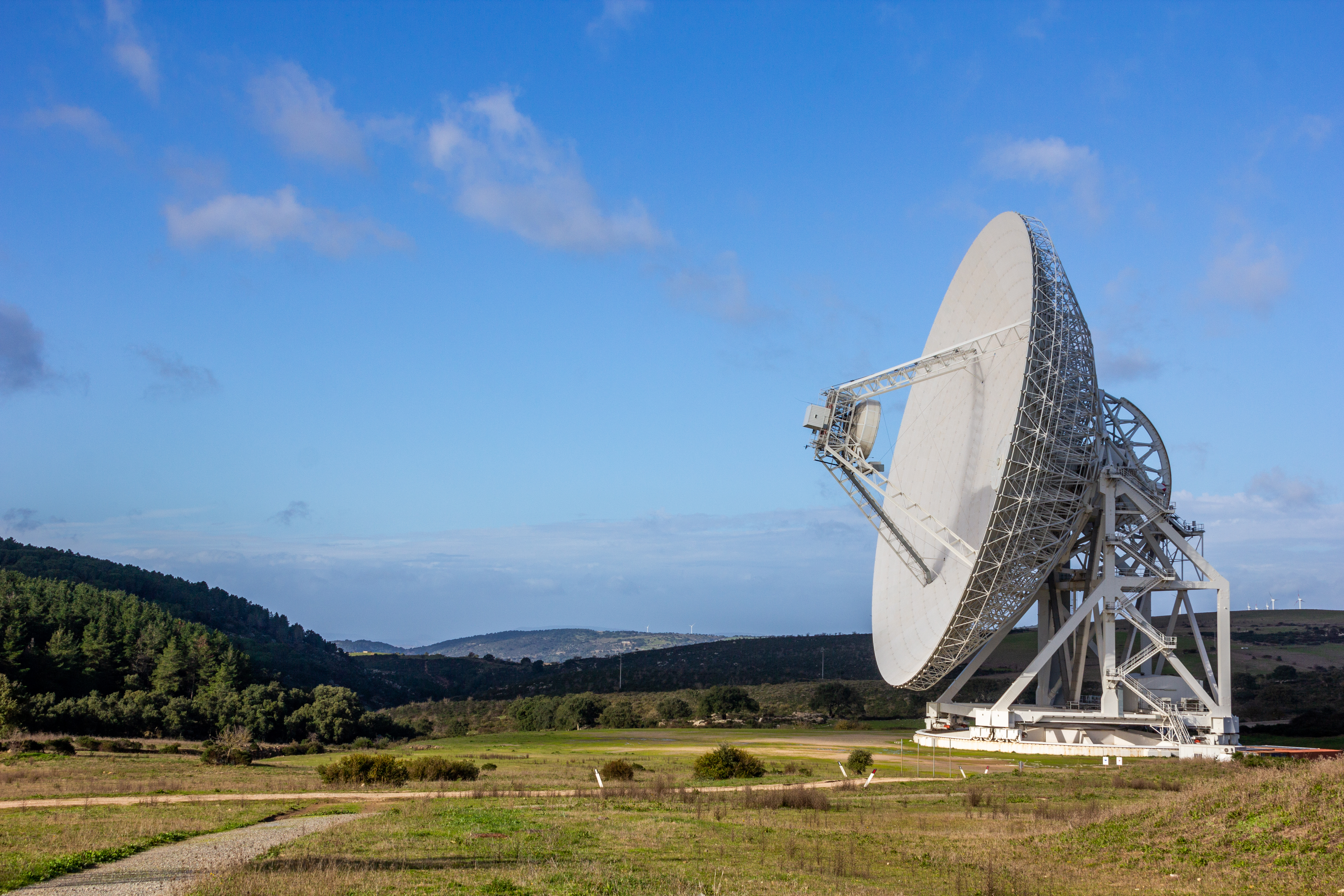
The SRT in 2019

The telescope is in Sardinia, 35 kilometres (22 mi) north of Cagliari, and is the largest of a set of three telescopes operated by INAF, along with telescopes at the Medicina Radio Observatory and the Noto Radio Observatory. It operates as a stand-alone instrument and as part of global networks of telescopes. The telescope and its structure weighs around 3,300 tonnes (3,300,000 kg).

The primary mirror is 64 metres (210 ft) in diameter. It has an active surface consisting of 1008 aluminum panels in 14 rows. Each panel has an area between 2.4 and 5.3 square metres. There are 1116 actuators mounted on the backing structure, which move the surface panels to correct for the distortion of the mirror with elevation. A quadrupod supports a 7.9 metres (26 ft) diameter subreflector, with 49 panels in three rows, as well as primary focus instrumentation.

The telescope is fully steerable. The telescope sits on a reinforced concrete base, carved into bedrock, with a continuously-welded track sitting on a 40 metres (130 ft) diameter outer ring, connected to the foundations with 260 pairs of anchor bolts, and supporting 16 wheels. In the centre is the azimuth bearing support, as well as the cable wrap and encoder system. The welded steel alidade then supports the elevation wheel, which is in turn connected to the primary mirror backing structure. A room at the base of the alidade holds the motor power supplies, antenna control system, and cryogenic compressors. Three rooms just below the primary surface contain the secondary focus receivers, as well as smaller mirrors and electronics.

The telescope will ultimately have 0.3–115 GHz (1 metre to 3mm) continuous frequency coverage. Initially three receivers were installed: an L band receiver in prime focus, a C-band receiver in the tertiary focus, and a 7-beam K-band receiver in the secondary focus.

As of 2021, an upgrade was in progress to include two new receivers to cover more of the potential bandwidth. This includes a set of 33-50 GHz receivers, and another set ranging from 70-116 GHz. This in turn requires the metrology and adjustment of the antenna be improved to allow efficient operation at such frequencies.

As part of a contract issued in 2024, the SRT is being upgraded with receivers in the X, K, and Ka bands to support space missions.

== Collaboration, construction and commissioning ==
The telescope is a collaboration between several research units of the National Institute for Astrophysics: the Istituto di Radioastronomia di Bologna, the Osservatorio Astronomico di Cagliari and the Osservatorio Astrofisico di Arcetri. Construction was funded by the Italian Ministry of Education and Scientific Research, the Sardinia Regional Government, the Italian Space Agency and INAF. The telescope cost around €70 million to construct.

The contract to fabricate the telescope structure and mechanics started in 2003, and the construction of the foundations was completed in 2004. The initial schedule was for inauguration in late-2006; construction ultimately was completed in mid-2012.

The telescope was constructed by MT Mechatronics GmbH of Germany. The first light was on 8 August 2012, using the Moon and 3C218 (Alphard). The technical commissioning phase ended in 2013, and formal inauguration was on 30 September 2013, with scientific commissioning between 2012 and 2015. Its first VLBI connection was in January 2014.

== Science ==
The telescope can operate in single dish mode, measuring continuum, polarisation and spectra. It is also used for very-long-baseline interferometry as part of the European VLBI Network, and with the space-based RadioAstron antenna. It is also used for space science, including deep space communication by the Italian Space Agency.
