= LIDAX =

- Company type: Private company
- Industry: Space and Scientific Industry
- Founded: 2000
- Headquarters: Paracuellos de Jarama, Community of Madrid, Spain
- Area served: Worldwide
- Services: Advanced mechanical systems, engineering, design and development for Space, on-ground instruments and high-energy particle applications.
- Number of employees: 26 (90 % engineers and technicians)
- Website: LIDAX

LIDAX is a space technology company, founded at the beginning of the year 2000. It designs and manufactures advanced mechanical equipments that form part of complex space flight systems and instruments for Earth observation (EarthCARE, Meteosat), planetary exploration (Exomars), astrophysics instrumentation (James Webb Space Telescope, BepiColombo, Plato, World Space Observatory) and telecom. The activities of the company encompass all aspects, from conceptual design, through integration and testing up to realization; both for satellite and on-ground instrumentation (OGSE & MGSE).

Engineers and technicians represent practically the 90% of the company's personnel. LIDAX also owns a specialized laboratory called SMARTLAB for testing space mechanisms and subsystems. In the Smartlab, the performance of mechanisms can be measured under different environmental conditions, thus, measurement tests with optical metrology can be carried out under vacuum, cryogenic and high temperature environments.

The company is headquartered in Paracuellos de Jarama, near Madrid-Barajas Airport, Spain. It operates next to the Spain's Space Agency Instituto Nacional de Técnica Aeroespacial (INTA, English: National Institute of Aerospace Technology) and other known space industries such as EADS CASA Espacio. (part of Astrium)

Since 2014, LIDAX forms part of SUMA Aerospace, a consortium set up with another three companies to become an internationally recognized organization for the design, manufacturing, commercialization and maintenance of electro-mechanical equipments for the aeronautic sector.

== Activity Areas ==
The activities of Lidax are focused mainly on the following areas:

- Space Instrumentation: Development of space innovative instrumentation such as cryogenic instruments, far infra-red instruments and robotic exploration. Specifically, focal plane assemblies, optical mounts for space telescopes, spectrometers and active folding mirrors.
- Space systems and components such as deployment mechanisms, cryogenic submicron linear Actuator submicron X-Y stage, M2 hexapods, space dry lubricated gearboxes, hold down and release mechanisms, qualified flexible thermal links,...

- On-ground instruments: Part of innovative scientific instruments such as, telescope instrumentation – atmosphere and telescope simulators for new adaptive optical methods –, particle accelerators – structural components or mechanisms for Cryomodules –, and others.

== Main projects ==
- MIRI telescope simulator (MTS). Active folding mirrors, a cryogenic OGSE for the mid-infrared instrument of the James Webb Space Telescope.
- Preliminary opto-mechanical design and feasibility studies. RAMAN-LIBS spectrometer for ExoMars.
- Design and construction of an Atmosphere and Telescope Simulator for adaptive optical studies of Gran Telescopio Canarias WHT & OGS Instituto de Astrofísica de Canarias
- Design and construction of the focal plane of the Mercury X-Ray spectrograph instrument (MIXS) for the BepiColombo mission.
- Preliminary design of a focal plane with multiple CCD for PLATO.
- Methodology studies about sub-micrometric measurements in cryogenic environments for infrared instrumentation.
- Development of sub-micrometric actuators and translation units for cryogenic environments.
- Development of a family of space planetary gearboxes for SatCom market.
