= Giampaolo Vettolani =

Italian astrophysicist

- Born: December 27, 1950
- Citizenship: Italian
- Education: University of Bologna
- Occupation: astrophysicist

Giampaolo Vettolani (born 27 December 1950) is an Italian astrophysicist, scientific director of the National Institute for Astrophysics in Rome (INAF) since 2012.

== Biography ==
In 1973 he graduated with a distinction in physics from the University of Bologna upon the thesis The angular momentum of galaxies (Il momento angolare delle Galassie), supervised by Giancarlo Setti.

Between 1974–1976 he was an assistant at the Institute of Astronomy at the University of Bologna. Later, in 1979–1980, he was Adjunct Professor and ran a degree course in astronomy.

From 1976 until 1988 he worked as a Researcher at the Institute of Radioastronomy (Istituto di Radioastronomia, IRA) of the Consiglio Nazionale delle Ricerche (CNR). There, in 1988–1991 he was the Senior Researcher, and from 1991 until 2011 he was the Research Executive. In 1984 he was a visiting scientist at the European Southern Observatory.

From 1994 until 1999 Vettolani was a member of the National Committee for Physical Sciences of the Consiglio Nazionale delle Ricerche. Approximately 30 research facilities were assigned to the Committee, with around 1500 researchers and technicians, in the fields of materials science, space physics, planetology, radioastronomy and atmospheric physics.

In 2005 his employer, the Institute of Radioastronomy, was incorporated into the National Institute for Astrophysics (Istituto Nazionale di Astrofisica, INAF). Since 2002, Vettolani was the Director of the Projects Department of the National Institute for Astrophysics. He left the position in 2010, as he exhausted the second term and was not renewable. Since 2012 he holds the position of the National Institute for Astrophysics' scientific director.

Vettolani's main research field is observational cosmology, including photometric and spectroscopic surveys of galaxy clusters and superclusters for the study of the large-scale structure of the Universe and survey of weak radio sources. As of 2013, he published 128 research papers in international peer review journals. He made contributions to books Wide-Field Spectroscopy (as co-editor, Springer 1997) and Catalogue Of Radial Velocities (as co-author, Routledge 2001). As of January 2021, his works were cited 13,142 times, while his h-index was 58, according to Google Scholar. He made 137 contributions to scientific conferences.

He was a member of the ESO Commission of the Ministry of Foreign Affairs of Italy (1992–1998), a member of the Working Group of the Ministry of Economic Development for the implementation of the Italy–Australia Cooperation Agreement for the „SKA – Square Kilometre Array Project” (since 2009), Italian representative in the Observing Program Committee of the European Southern Observatory (1992–1999), a member of the Expert Group of the OECD-GlobalScience Forum for „Large-Scale Programs and Projects in Astronomy and Astrophysics” (2003–2004), a member of the International Committee for Astronomy in Canary Islands (2003–2006), a member of the Board of the Large Binocular Telescope (LBT) Corporation, Tucson, AZ (2003–2011), a member of the Board and Executive Committee of the I3 Opticon of the European Commission for the Coordination of Optical Astronomy in Europe (since 2003), a member of the Steering Committee for the Extremely Large Telescope project of the European Southern Observatory (FP6 and FP7 Design Studies, funded by the European Commission, since 2005), a member of the Board of the European Project Prep SKA (FP7 Preparation Study) for the RadiotelescopeSquare KilometerArray (2008–2011), a member of the Expert Group of the OECD-Global Science Forum „Establishing Large International Research Infrastructures” (2009), a member of the Funding Board of the European Cherenkov Telescope Array Project (since 2011), and an expert of the Agence de la mutation de la recherche et de l'enseignement superieur (AERES, 2011).

He was also a member of Advisory Committees and Scientific Committees for the production of telescopes and instrumentation such as, for example, the FUEGOS spectrograph for the Very Large Telescope (1991–1993, ESO), the VST telescope (Chairman SC 1996–1997, ESO-INAF), and the MODS spectrograph of the Ohio State University for the Large Binocular Telescope (2005).

He was also a member of Scientific Organizing Committees of national and international conferences and reviewer for magazines such as Astronomy & Astrophysics, The Astronomical Journal and Monthly Notices of the Royal Astronomical Society.

Beside Italian, which is his mother tongue, he also speaks English, French and Spanish.

Vettolani is a distant relative of the Polish family Vetulani.
