= Joint Institute for Very Long Baseline Interferometry European Research Infrastructure Consortium =

International research consortium

Joint Institute for VLBI ERIC
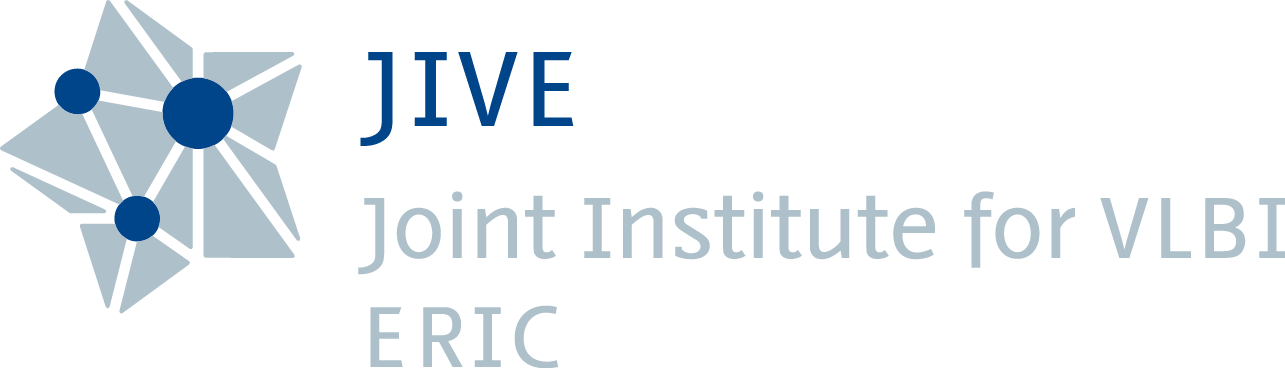
- Logo of the JIVE Organization
- Formation: 1993
- Purpose: Operate the European VLBI Network provide support to very-long-baseline interferometry astronomers
- Location: Oude Hoogeveensedijk 4, 7991 PD Dwingeloo, The Netherlands
- Website: www.jive.eu

The Joint Institute for Very Long Baseline Interferometry European Research Infrastructure Consortium (JIVE ERIC) was established by a decision of the European Commission in December 2014, and assumed the activities and responsibilities of the JIVE foundation, which was established in December 1993. JIVE's mandate is to support the operations and users of the European VLBI Network (EVN), in the widest sense.

Very-long baseline interferometry (VLBI) is a type of astronomical interferometry used in radio astronomy. It allows observations of an object that are made simultaneously by many telescopes to be combined, emulating a telescope with a size equal to the maximum separation between the telescopes. Normally the participating radio telescopes function individually, working on their own specific projects. In the case of VLBI, they all observe the same source at the same time, allowing much higher spatial resolution. There are many complex and challenging hurdles that need to be overcome to enable this effort. One challenge is the data processing requirement. JIVE operates the EVN data processor, known as the correlator - a special-purpose supercomputer for astronomical VLBI data correlation.

== Organisation of JIVE ERIC ==
JIVE ERIC is located in Dwingeloo, the Netherlands and is hosted by the Netherlands Institute for Radio Astronomy (ASTRON).

Prof. Richard T. Schilizzi was the founding director, followed by Michael_Garrett_(astronomer), Huib J. van Langevelde, Francisco Colomer, and currently the role is on Agnieszka Slowikowska.

JIVE ERIC has seven members:

- The Netherlands, represented by the Netherlands Organisation for Scientific Research (NWO) and the Netherlands Institute for Radio Astronomy (ASTRON)
- France, represented by the National Center for Scientific Research (CNRS)
- Latvia, represented by the Ministry of Education and Science (IZM)
- Spain, represented by the Ministry of Transport, Mobility and Urban Agenda (MITMA)
- Sweden, represented by the Swedish Research Council (VR)
- The United Kingdom, represented by the Science and Technology Facilities Council (STFC)
- Italy, represented by the Istitutio Nazionale di Astrofisica (INAF)

JIVE ERIC is also supported by the following participating research institutes:

- National Astronomical Observatories of China (NAOC), China
- Max Planck Institute for Radio Astronomy (MPIfR), Germany
- National Research Federation (NRF), South Africa

There are currently 19 telescopes in the EVN.

Observations using the EVN can also be carried out in real-time, thus earning the name of e-VLBI (electronic Very Long Baseline Interferometry). The telescopes are then linked via high-speed national research and education networks (NRENs) which overcome some of the performance drawbacks of TCP/IP and UDP/IP (networking protocols) to allow sharing large volumes of data for immediate use. Such high-speed networks eliminate the shipping of disks of data from separate observations for correlation, thus allowing astronomers to respond to events as they happen in real time. The VLBI data are streamed to JIVE, where they are correlated and the final, high-resolution image created.

In a demonstration of e-VLBI as part of 100 Hours of Astronomy in 2009 14 telescopes from Australia, Chile, China, Finland, Germany, Italy, the Netherlands, Poland, Puerto Rico, Spain, Sweden and the UK participated in joint observations of the active galaxy 3C120. The participating telescopes included:

- the 26 meter telescope at Hobart, operated by the University of Tasmania;
- the 22m dish of Mopra, part of the Long Baseline Array, operated by CSIRO;
- the 25m dish of Sheshan near Shanghai, operated by the Shanghai Astronomical Observatory, Chinese Academy of Sciences;
- the 14m Metsähovi dish, operated by the Aalto University;
- the 32m telescope of Toruń;
- the 32m telescope at Medicina, operated by the Instituto Nazionale di Astrofisica;
- the 25m telescope at the Onsala Space Observatory;
- the Westerbork Synthesis Radio Telescope;
- the Yebes 40m, operated by the Observatorio Astronomico Nacional;
- the 300m dish of Arecibo, located in Puerto Rico;
- the 6m dish of TIGO, operated by the Geodätisches Observatorium Wettzell.
