= Spektr-R =

Russian satellite

Spektr-R Спектр-Р
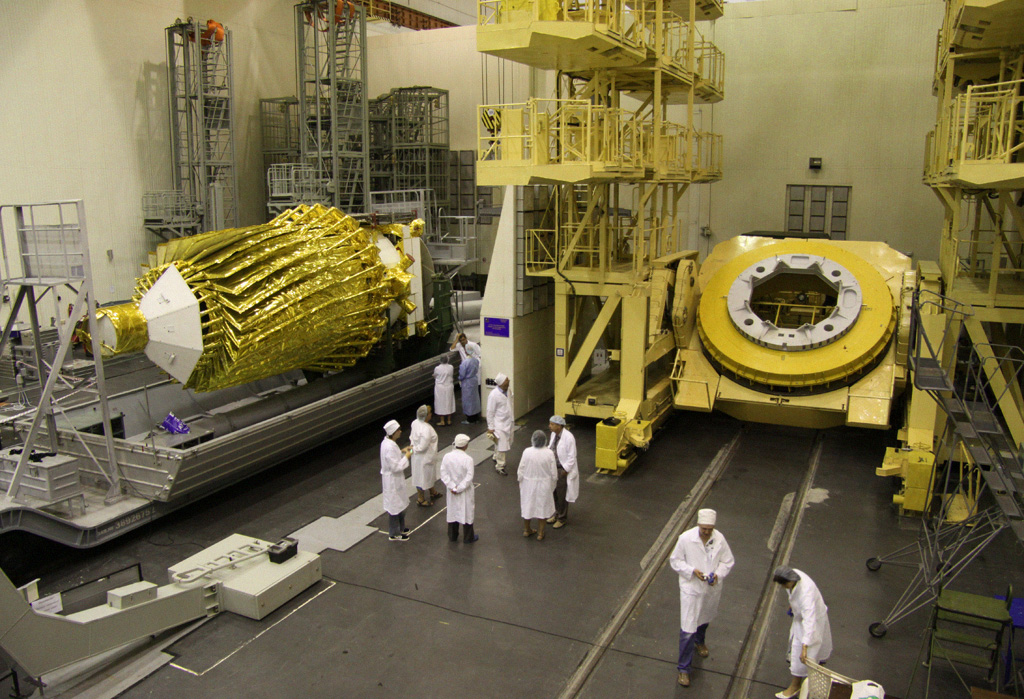
- Spektr-R at the integration and test complex of Launch Pad No.31, the Baikonur Space Center in July 2011
- Names: RadioAstron
- Mission type: Radio telescope
- Operator: Russian Astro Space Center
- COSPAR ID: 2011-037A
- SATCAT no.: 37755
- Website: http://www.asc.rssi.ru/radioastron/
- Mission duration: Planned: 5 years Achieved: 7 years, 10 months, 11 days

Spacecraft properties
- Bus: Navigator
- Manufacturer: NPO Lavochkin
- Launch mass: 3,660 kg (8,069 lb)
- Payload mass: 2,500 kg (5,512 lb)

Start of mission
- Launch date: 18 July 2011, 02:31 UTC
- Rocket: Zenit-3F
- Launch site: Baikonur Cosmodrome Pad 45/1
- Contractor: Roscosmos

End of mission
- Disposal: Equipment failure
- Declared: 30 May 2019
- Last contact: 11 January 2019

Orbital parameters
- Reference system: Geocentric
- Regime: Highly elliptical
- Semi-major axis: 180,974.7 km (112,452 mi)
- Eccentricity: 0.905900
- Perigee altitude: 10,651.6 km (6,619 mi)
- Apogee altitude: 338,541.5 km (210,360 mi)
- Inclination: 42.46°
- Period: 12769.93 min
- RAAN: 67.28°
- Argument of perigee: 244.85°
- Mean anomaly: 3.07°
- Mean motion: 0.1126 rev/day
- Epoch: 24 February 2016, 23:21:29 UTC
- Revolution no.: 197

Main telescope
- Diameter: 10 m (33 ft)
- Focal length: 4.22 m (13.8 ft)
- Wavelengths: 92, 18, 6, 1.3 cm

Spektr-R (part of RadioAstron program) (Russian: Спектр-Р) was a Russian scientific satellite with a 10 m (33 ft) radio telescope on board. It was launched on 18 July 2011 on a Zenit-3F launcher from Baikonur Cosmodrome, and was designed to perform research on the structure and dynamics of radio sources within and beyond the Milky Way. Together with some of the largest ground-based radio telescopes, the Spektr-R formed interferometric baselines extending up to 350,000 km (220,000 mi).

On 11 January 2019, the spacecraft stopped responding to ground control, but its science payload was described as "operational". The mission never recovered from the January 2019 incident, and the mission was declared finished (and spacecraft operations ended) on 30 May 2019.

== Overview ==
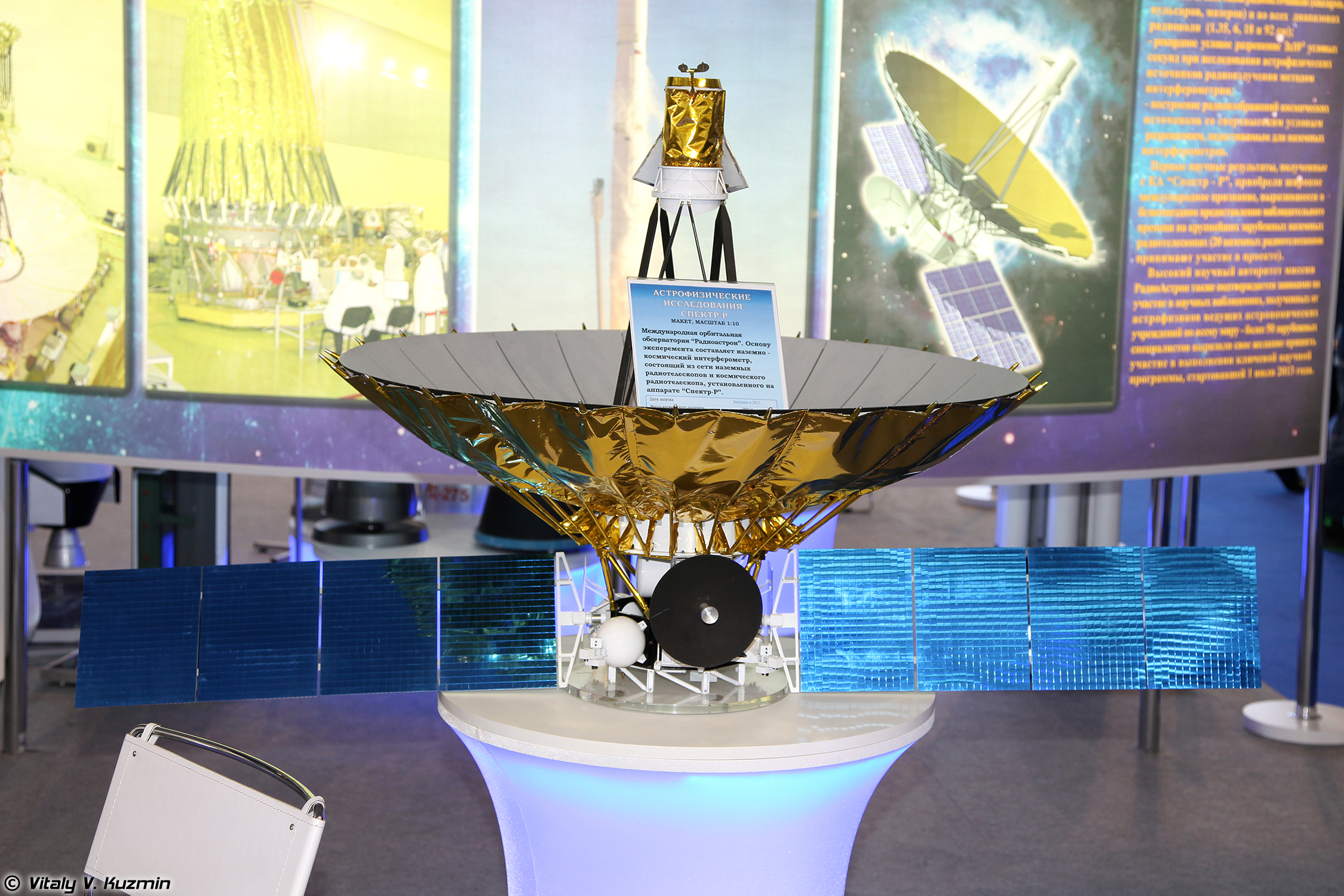
Model of Spektr-R

The Spektr-R project was funded by the Astro Space Center of Russia, and was launched into Earth orbit on 18 July 2011, with a perigee of 10,000 km (6,200 mi) and an apogee of 390,000 km (240,000 mi), about 700 times the orbital height of the Hubble Space Telescope at its highest point and 20 times at its lowest. In comparison, the average distance from Earth to the Moon is 384,400 km (238,900 mi). As of 2018, the satellite has a much more stable orbit with a perigee of 57,000 km (35,000 mi) and an apogee of 320,000 km (200,000 mi), with its orbit no longer intersecting the Moon's orbit and being stable for possibly hundreds or even thousands of years.

The main scientific goal of the mission was the study of astronomical objects with an angular resolution up to a few millionths of an arcsecond. This was accomplished by using the satellite in conjunction with ground-based observatories and interferometry techniques. Another purpose of the project was to develop an understanding of fundamental issues of astrophysics and cosmology. This included star formations, the structure of galaxies, interstellar space, black holes and dark matter.

Spektr-R was one of the instruments in the RadioAstron program, an international network of observatories led by the Astro Space Center of the Lebedev Physical Institute.

The telescope was intended for radio-astrophysical observations of extragalactic objects with ultra-high resolution, as well as researching of characteristics of near-Earth and interplanetary plasma. The very high angular resolving power was achieved in conjunction with a ground-based system of radio-telescopes and interferometrical methods, operating at wavelengths of 1.35–6.0, 18.0 and 92.0 cm. Once in space, the flower-like main dish was to open its 27 'petals' within 30 minutes.

There was a science payload of opportunity on board, PLASMA-F, which consists of four instruments to observe solar wind and the outer magnetosphere. These instruments are the energetic particle spectrometer MEP-2, the magnetometer MMFF, the solar wind monitor BMSW, and the data collection and processing unit SSNI-2.

At launch the mass of the spacecraft was 3,660 kg (8,070 lb). It was launched from the Baikonur Cosmodrome on 18 July 2011 at 02:31 UTC by a Zenit-3F launch vehicle, which is composed of a Zenit-2M with a Fregat-SB upper stage.

On 11 January 2019, the spacecraft stopped responding to ground control. It was unknown whether the issue could be fixed, or whether the spacecraft's mission would be ended. With Spektr-R's status unknown and the problems hitting the Mikhailo Lomonosov satellite, the Russian space program had no operational space observatories as of 12 January 2019. This changed with the launch of the Spektr-RG satellite in July 2019.

The mission was declared as finished on 30 May 2019.

The external tank of the Fregat upper stage that delivered the Spektr-R observatory into orbit exploded on May 8, 2020, generating at least 65 trackable debris in orbit around Earth.

== History of the project ==
At the beginning of the 1980s, one of the USSR's leading developers of scientific space probes had completed a preliminary design of revolutionary, new-generation spacecraft, 1F and 2F. The main purpose of Spektr was to develop a common platform that could be used for future deep-space missions.

NPO Lavochkin hoped to use the designs of the 1F as the standard design for space telescopes. In 1982, NPO Lavochkin had completed technical blueprints for RadioAstron, a space-based radio telescope. The expectation was that the 1F and 2F spacecraft would follow the expectations of the RadioAstron mission (also known as Astron-2).

Early on, many criticized the 1F platform for its questionable astrophysics missions, even when compared to the older 4V spacecraft bus. Although the attitude control system of the 1F seemed to have little issues navigating planetary probes, its accuracy was much below the standard requirements for a high-precision telescope. To add to 1F's technical issues, the spacecraft seemed to lack electrically driven fly-wheels, which critics believed would have increased its stabilization in space. The spacecraft also failed to have a moveable solar panel system, which could track the position of the Sun without requiring the entire satellite to reposition, eventually disrupting the observations process.

It was one of three competing Spectrum missions, the others being Spektr X-Gamma and Spektr-UV

On 1 August 1983, VPK, the Soviet Military Industrial Commission commissioned an official decision (number 274) titled, "On works for creation of automated interplanetary vehicles for the exploration of planets of the Solar System, the Moon and cosmic space". This document outlined a new impetus for the development of satellites. The new technical proposals submitted in mid-1984 included a gamma-ray telescope designated to register radio waves in the millimetre range. Both of these satellites incorporated rotating solar panels, a highly sensitive star-tracking operating system and fly wheels.

By the end of the 1980s, NPO Lavochkin Designer General, Vyacheslav Kovtunenko (ru), proposed to design all future astrophysics satellites on the current Oko-1 spacecraft model, designed originally to track incoming ballistic missiles. According to this plan, Oko-1 (a missile-watching infrared telescope) would eventually be replaced with scientific instruments where the satellite would be pointed towards space rather than Earth.

== Observing techniques ==
Using a technique called very-long-baseline interferometry, it was anticipated that ground telescopes in Australia, Chile, China, India, Japan, Korea, Mexico, Russia, South Africa, Ukraine and the United States would jointly make observations with the RadioAstron spacecraft.

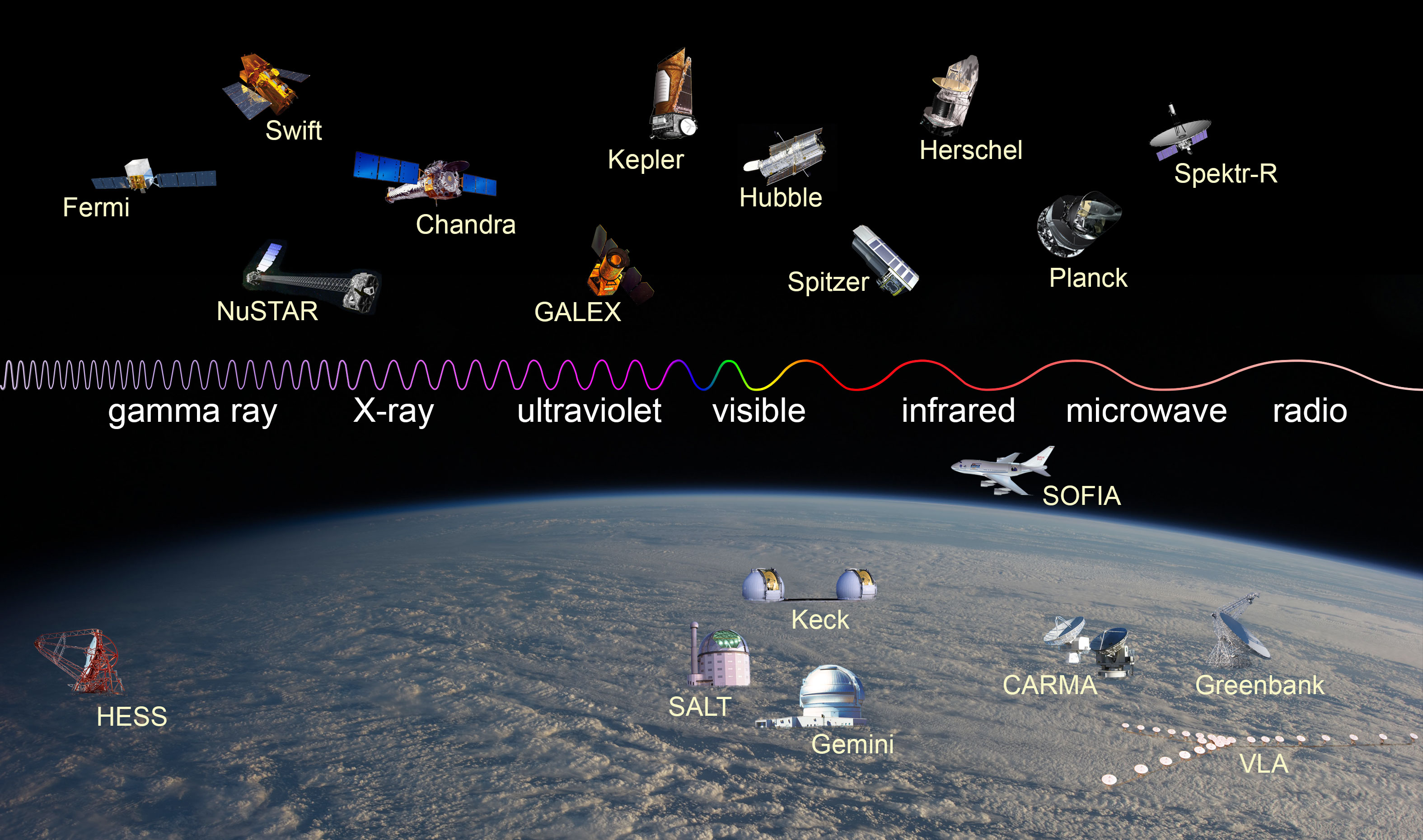
A selection of telescopes operating at wavelengths across the electromagnetic spectrum

The RadioAstron satellite's main 10-metre radio telescope would communicate in four different bands of radio waves with the international ground telescopes. It can also locate sources from two frequencies simultaneously. The Spektr-R was also planned to include a secondary BMSV within the Plazma-F experiment, the goal of which was to measure the directions and intensity of solar wind. In May 2011, the news agency RIA Novosti reported that the BMSV instrument would indeed be on board. It was also reported that the BMSV would carry a micrometeoroid counter made in Germany.

The RadioAstron was expected to extend into a highly elliptical orbit in the Fregat state of the Zenit rocket's launch. Spektr-R's closest point (perigee) would be 500 kilometres (310 mi) above the Earth's surface, with its apogee 340,000 kilometres (210,000 mi) away. The operational orbit would last at least nine years, with the RadioAstron never being in the Earth's shadow for more than two hours.

With its apogee as far as the orbit of the Moon, Spektr-R could be considered a deep-space mission. In fact, the gravitational pull of the Moon was expected to fluctuate the satellite's orbit in three-year cycles, with its apogee travelling between 265,000 and 360,000 kilometres (220,000 mi) from Earth and its perigee between 400 and 65,000 kilometres (250 and 40,390 mi). Each orbit would take RadioAstron around eight to nine days. This drift would vastly augment the telescope's range of vision. It was estimated that the satellite would have upwards of 80% of its potential targets within view at any one point in its orbit. The first 45 days of Spektr-R's orbit were scheduled to consist of engineering commissioning, that is, the launch of the main antenna, various systems checks and communications tests.

Spektr-R's tracking was to be handled by the RT-22 radio telescope in Pushchino, Russia. Flight control would be operated by ground stations in Medvezhi Ozera near Moscow and Ussuriysk in Russia's Far East. Other Spektr-R joint observations would be handled by ground telescopes in Arecibo, Badary, Effelsberg, Green Bank, Medicina, Noto, Svetloe, Zelenchukskaya and Westerbork.

The Spektr-R project was led by the Russian Academy of Sciences's Astro Space Center of the Lebedev Physics Institute. The radio receivers on Spektr-R were to be built in India and Australia. In earlier plans, two additional receivers were to be provided by firms under contract with the European VLBI Consortium, the EVN. These additional payloads were eventually cancelled, with the project citing old age. Similar Russian materials replaced the Indian and Australian instruments.

== See also ==
- Spektr-RG
- Spektr-UV
- HALCA
