= Medicina Radio Observatory =

Astronomical observatory near Bologna, Italy

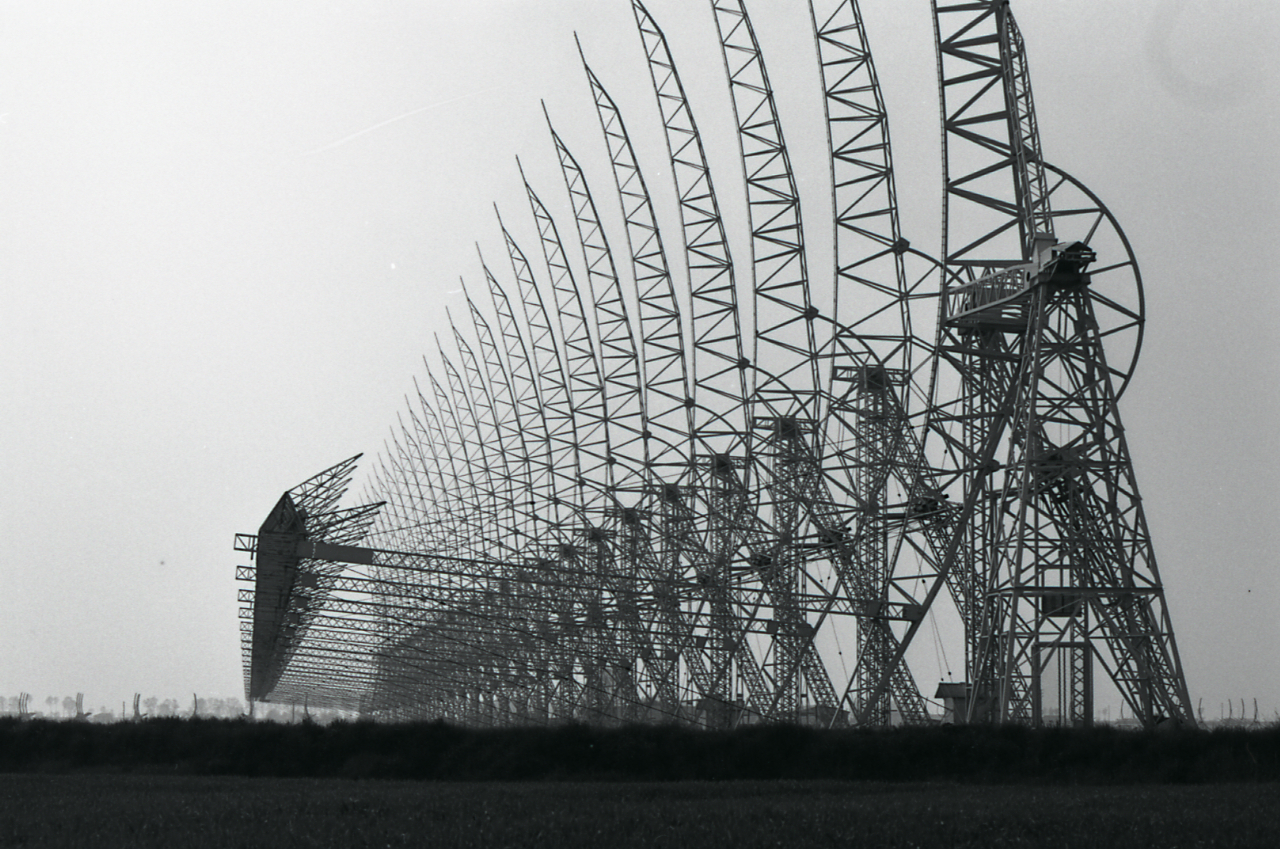
- Photo by Paolo Monti, 1974
- Organization: Istituto di Radioastronomia di Bologna; National Institute for Astrophysics
- Location: Bologna, Metropolitan City of Bologna, Emilia-Romagna, Italy
- Coordinates: 44°31′15″N 11°38′49″E
- Website: www.med.ira.inaf.it/index.html
- Telescopes: Gavril Grueff radio telescope; Northern Cross Radio Telescope
- Location of Medicina Radio Observatory
- Related media on Commons

The Medicina Radio Observatory is an astronomical observatory located 30 km from Bologna, Italy. It is operated by the Institute for Radio Astronomy of the National Institute for Astrophysics (INAF) of the government of Italy.

The site includes:

- 32-metre diameter parabolic antenna for observing between 1.4 and 23 GHz. The 32-m antenna is used as a single-dish instrument for astrophysical observations (such as water and methanol maser spectroscopy), SETI experiments and radar monitoring of Near Earth Objects. In interferometric mode it functions as a VLBI station, part of the European VLBI Network (EVN).
- 564 by 640 m (30000 square meter) multi-element Northern Cross cylindrical-parabolic transit radio telescope for observing at 408 MHz.

== Northern Cross Radio Telescope ==
The Northern Cross Radio Telescope (also known as the Medicina Northern Cross (MNC)) (and Croce del Nord in Italian) is one of the largest transit radio telescopes in the world. Observations are focused around 408 MHz (UHF band), corresponding to 73.5 cm wavelength. The older receivers of the telescope function with a 2.5 MHz wide frequency band, while the upgraded parts have a 16 MHz bandwidth. The telescope is steerable only in declination, meaning that it can solely observe objects that are culminating on the local celestial meridian. The telescope is T-shaped and consists of:

- E/W (east–west) arm – Single reflector 560 m x 35 m (1536 dipoles)
- N/S (north–south) arm – Array of 64 reflectors 640 m x 23.5 m (4096 dipoles)

The telescope can provide 22880 possible theoretical independent beams and has a field of view of 55.47 degrees (east–west) by 1.8 degrees (north–south). The resolution is around 4–5 arcminutes in the north–south direction, and 4 arcminutes in the east–west direction. While less than the resolution of large optical telescopes, the amount of radiation that can be gathered with the Northern Cross is much greater, proportional to the mirror surface of approximately 27400 square meters. Northern Cross represents the largest UHF-band antenna in the Northern Hemisphere, with an aperture efficiency of 60%, making it second in the world, after the Arecibo radio telescope. This allows the Northern Cross to identify and measure extremely faint sources, making the telescope is particularly suitable to extragalactic research.

There are plans upgrade of the east–west arm telescope to a LOFAR SuperStation, due to the good performances of a cylindrical-parabolic antenna in the 100–700 MHz frequency range. Since LOFAR operates in the 120–240 MHz range, some of the sensors on the Northern Cross Radio Telescope, optimized for 408 MHz, will have to be replaced with broadband antennas. This installation will have an effective area much larger than any other remote LOFAR station. If extended to the whole 22000 square meters area of the east–west arm, this single element effective area of 20 standard remote LOFAR stations. The resulting system will provide significant improvement in observation sensitivity.

== Square Kilometre Array pathfinder ==
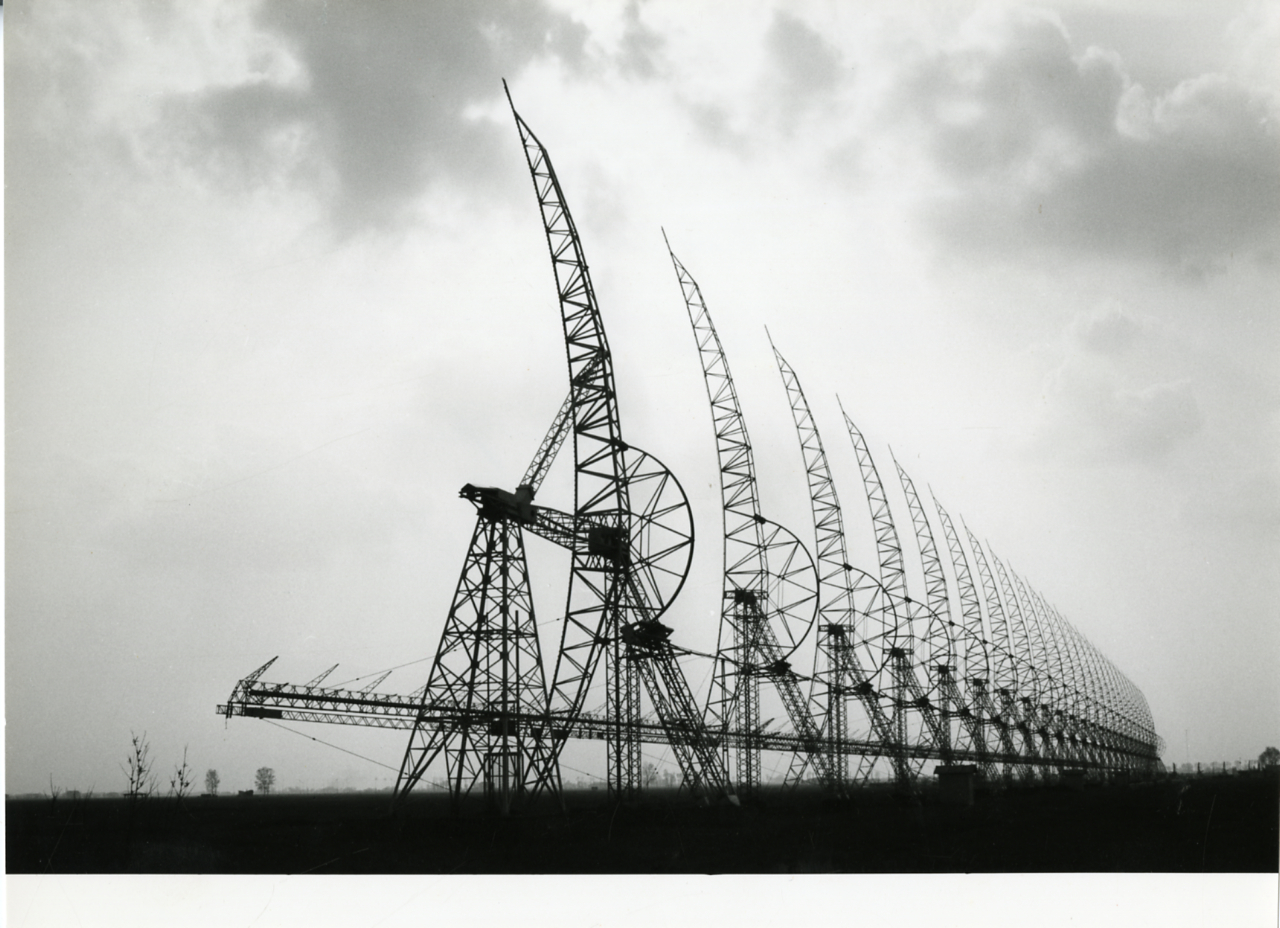
Photo by Paolo Monti

The Cross is currently used as a pathfinder for the Square Kilometre Array. The work is focused on studying the amplification and filtering of signals between the LNA (Low Noise Amplifier) output and the analog-to-digital converter input for the SKA. The Medicina Radio Observatory is studying all problems related to "antenna array implementation" through a prototype installation called MAD (Medicina Array Demonstrator).

The observatory staff have also built new receiver demonstrators for the SKA called BEST (Basic Element for SKA Training), part of the EU-funded SKADS (SKA Design Studies) programme. The project started in 2005 and finished in 2009. It involved the installation of the new receivers on some reflectors of the north–south section (and later east–west section) of the Northern Cross telescope, along with new analog fiber-optic and coaxial digital finks from the front-end receiver boxes to the back-ends. The BEST project was divided in three parts:

- BEST-1 – 4 new receivers were installed on a single reflector of the north–south arm.
- BEST-2 – 32 receivers were installed on 8 reflectors of the north–south arm.
- BEST-3lo focused on lower frequencies – between 120 and 240 MHz. Log periodic antennas optimized for 120–240 MHz, along with 18 receivers were installed on part of the east–west arm.

== Space debris tracking ==
There is an ongoing effort to use the 32-meter dish as a receiver for radar-based tracking of artificial satellites and space debris in Earth orbit. The system functions as a bistatic radar, where an emitter located in a different location sends a signal, which bounces off objects in orbit and the echo is picked up by a receiver. The 32-meter dish acts as a receiver, while usually the Yevpatoria 70 meter located in Crimea, functions as a transmitter. The systems can either actively track debris to determine their orbit more precisely or utilize a technique called beam park, where the transmitting and receiving antennas are kept fixed at a given position and the debris pass in and out of the observed area. The measurements obtain through such a system can be used to determine object radar cross-section, time of peak occurrence, polarization ratio, bistatic doppler shift and target rotation. In one of the carried-out tests, Yevpatoria-Medicina system was able to detect an object with an estimated radar cross-section of 0.0002 square meters, which was created by the Iridium 33 and Kosmos-2251 satellite collision. The system can also function as a multistatic radar using the 32-meter receivers at Medicina, the Noto Radio Observatory in Italy and the Ventspils Starptautiskais Radioastronomijas Centrs in Latvia.

The Northern Cross radio telescope has also been part of space debris tracking studies, utilized as a multiple-beam receiver for a bistatic radar system. The first tested configuration is a quasi-monostatic radar system with a 3 m dish as the transmitter, located in Bagnara – 20 km from the receiver. The second configuration was a simulation of a true bistatic radar system with 7 m dish as the transmitter located at the site of the Sardinia Radio Telescope (SRT). The system has a maximum field-of-view of about 100 square degrees and a collecting area of approximately 27400 square meters and is capable of providing up to 22880 beams, each 4 by 4 arcminutes wide. Tracking the sequence of beams that are illuminated, makes it possible for the system to track with a higher level of detail, with respect to the single-beam systems, the ground track of a transiting object. The Northern Cross radio telescope in a bistatic radar configuration is also part of the Space Surveillance and Tracking (SST) segment of the ESA Space Situational Awareness Programme (SSA).

== See also ==
- Istituto di Radioastronomia di Bologna
- List of radio telescopes
- Noto Radio Observatory
- Sardinia Radio Telescope
