= European VLBI Network =

Network of radio telescopes across Europe that link together for radio interferometry

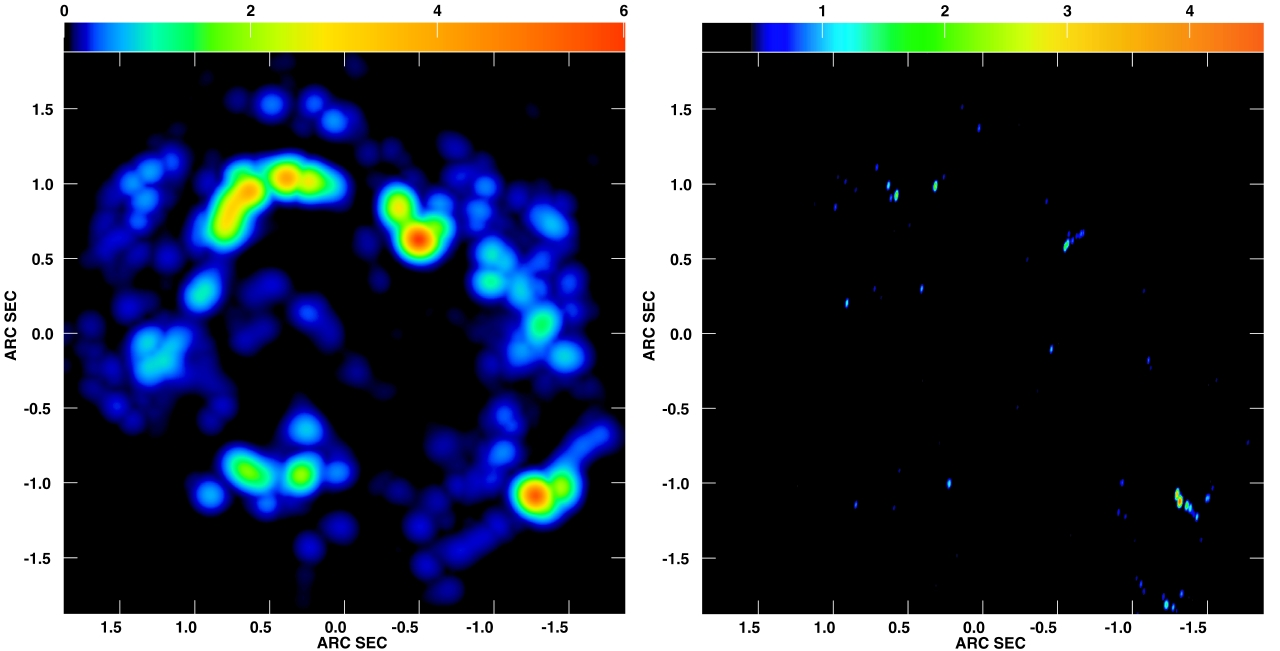
- The first e-VLBI science image produced by the European VLBI Network
- Alternative names: EVN
- Organization: Joint Institute for Very Long Baseline Interferometry European Research Infrastructure Consortium
- Website: www.evlbi.org
- Telescopes: Cambridge MERLIN telescope; Gavril Grueff radio telescope; Metsahovi 14m radio telescope; Nanshan Radio Telescope; Noto 32-m radio telescope; Onsala Space Observatory 20 m telescope; Onsala Space Observatory 25 m telescope; Sheshan 25m radio telescope; Toruń RT4; Wettzell 20m radio telescope; Arecibo Telescope; Effelsberg 100-metre Radio Telescope; Hartebeesthoek Radio Astronomy Observatory; Lovell Telescope; Madrid Deep Space Communications Complex; Mark II; Westerbork Synthesis Radio Telescope; Yebes Observatory RT40m
- Related media on Commons

The European VLBI Network (EVN) is a network of radio telescopes located primarily in Europe and Asia, with additional antennas in South Africa and Puerto Rico, which performs very high angular resolution observations of cosmic radio sources using very-long-baseline interferometry (VLBI). The EVN is the most sensitive VLBI array in the world, and the only one capable of real-time observations. The Joint Institute for VLBI ERIC (JIVE) acts as the central organisation in the EVN, providing both scientific user support and a correlator facility. Very Long Baseline Interferometry (VLBI) achieves ultra-high angular resolution and is a multi-disciplinary technique used in astronomy, geodesy and astrometry.

The EVN operates an open-sky policy, allowing anyone to propose an observation using the network

== EVN Telescopes ==
The EVN network comprises 22 telescope facilities:

Name	Dish Size	Location	Operated by
Effelsberg 100-m Radio Telescope	100 metres	Effelsberg, Germany	Max Planck Institute for Radio Astronomy
Westerbork Synthesis Radio Telescope	12 x 25 metres	Westerbork, Netherlands	ASTRON
Sardinia Radio Telescope	64 metres	San Basilio, Italy	Istituto Nazionale di Astrofisica
Lovell Telescope	76 metres	Goostrey, Cheshire, United Kingdom	Jodrell Bank Observatory
Cambridge 32 metres	32 metres	Mullard Radio Astronomy Observatory, United Kingdom	Jodrell Bank Observatory
Mark II	25 metres	Goostrey, Cheshire, United Kingdom	Jodrell Bank Observatory
Medicina Radio Observatory	32 metres	Medicina, Italy	Istituto Nazionale di Astrofisica
Onsala Space Observatory	25 metres and 20 metres	Onsala, Sweden	Chalmers University of Technology
Ventspils International Radio Astronomy Centre	32 metres and 16 metres	Ventspils, Irbene, Latvia	Ventspils University College
Noto Radio Observatory	32 metres	Noto, Italy	Istituto Nazionale di Astrofisica
Toruń Centre for Astronomy	32 metres	Toruń, Poland	Nicolaus Copernicus University
Metsähovi Radio Observatory	14 metres	Kirkkonummi, Finland	Aalto University
Sheshan 25 metres	25 metres	Sheshan, Shanghai, China	Shanghai Astronomical Observatory
Nanshan 25 metres	25 metres	Ürümqi, China	
Spanish National Observatory	40 metres and 14 metres	Yebes, Guadalajara, Spain	Instituto Geográfico Nacional (Spain)
Wettzell (20m Radio telescope)	20 metres	Germany	Bundesamt für Kartographie und Geodäsie (BKG) and Technical University of Munich (TUM)
Madrid Deep Space Communication Complex	70 metres 34 metres	Robledo de Chavela, Spain	INTA / NASA / JPL
Hartebeesthoek Radio Astronomy Observatory	26 metres	Hartebeesthoek, South Africa	National Research Foundation of South Africa
Arecibo Observatory	305 metres	(United States) Arecibo, Puerto Rico	SRI International / USRA / UMET
RAO Svetloe	32 metres	Leningrad, Russia	Institute of Applied Astronomy
RAO Zelenchuckskaya	32 metres	Zelenchukskaya, Zelenchuksky, Karachay-Cherkessia, Russia	Institute of Applied Astronomy
RAO Badary	32 metres	Badary, Tunkinsky, Buryatia, Russia	Institute of Applied Astronomy

Additionally the EVN often links with the UK-based 7-element Jodrell Bank MERLIN interferometer. It can also be connected to the US Very Long Baseline Array (VLBA), achieving a global VLBI, obtaining sub-milliarcsecond resolution at frequencies higher than 5 GHz.

== e-EVN ==
Since 2004, the EVN has started to be linked together using international fibre optic networks, through a technique known as e-VLBI. The EXPReS project was designed to connect telescopes at Gigabit per second links via their National Research Networks and the Pan-European research network GÉANT2, and make the first astronomical experiments using this new technique. This allows researchers to take advantage of the e-EVN's Targets of Opportunity for conducting follow-on observations of transient events such as X-ray binary flares, supernova explosions and gamma-ray bursts.

EXPReS's objectives are to connect up to 16 of the world's most sensitive radio telescopes on six continents to the central data processor of the European VLBI Network at the Joint Institute for VLBI ERIC (JIVE). Specific activities involve securing "last-mile connections" and upgrading existing connections to the telescopes, updating the correlator to process up to 16 data streams at 1 Gbit/s each in real time and research possibilities for distributed computing to replace the centralized data processor.

== History ==
The EVN was formed in 1980 by a consortium of five of the major radio astronomy institutes in Europe (the European Consortium for VLBI). Since 1980, the EVN and the Consortium has grown to include many institutes with numerous radio telescopes in several western European countries as well as associated institutes with telescopes in Russia, Ukraine, China and South Africa. Proposals for an additional telescope in Spain are under consideration.

Observations using the EVN have contributed to scientific research on Fast Radio Bursts (FRBs), gravitational lensing, and supermassive black holes.

== See also ==
- Northern Extended Millimeter Array
