= Large Millimeter Telescope =

Astronomy telescope in Mexico

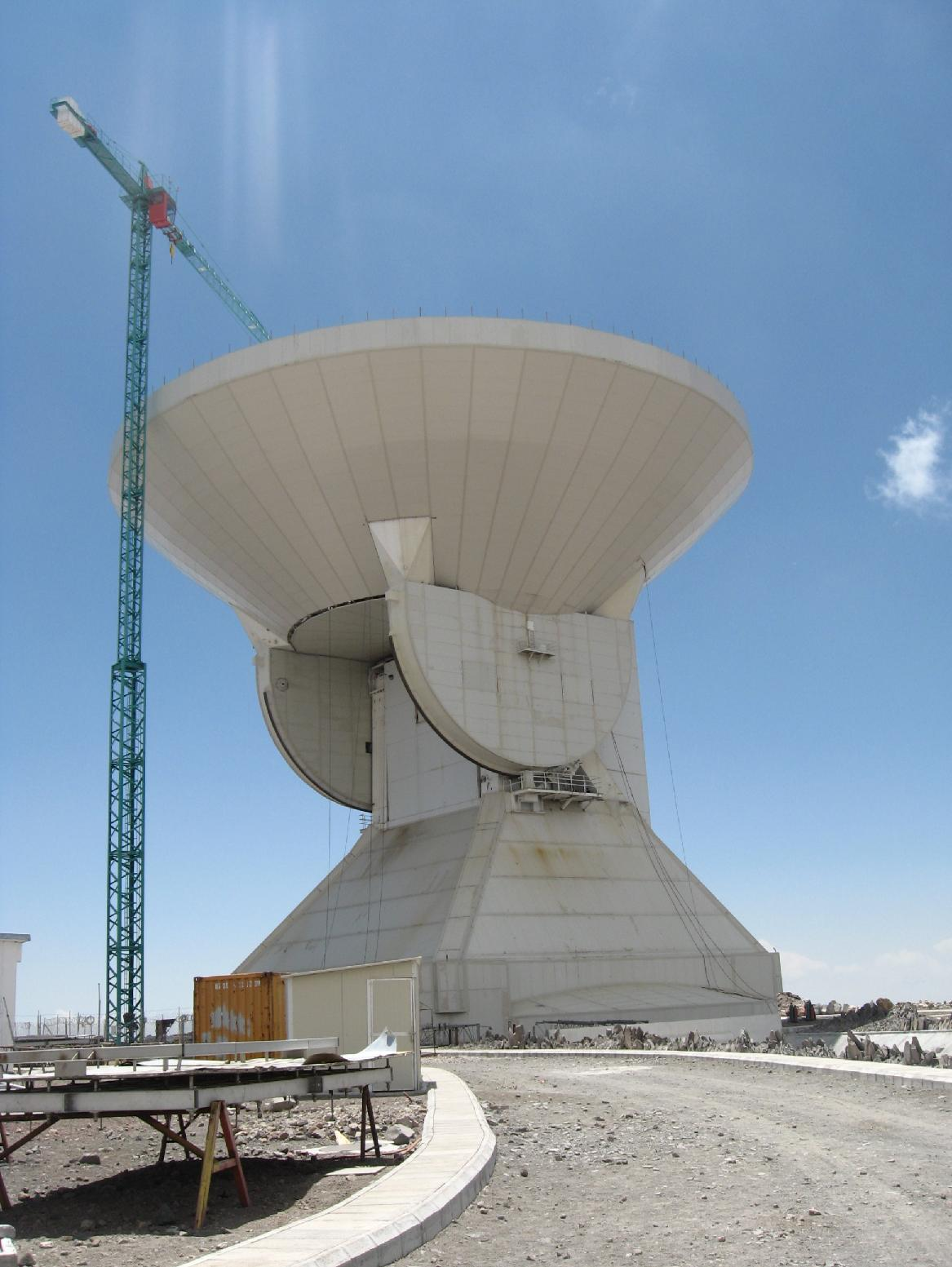
- Alternative names: LMT
- Location: Sierra Negra
- Coordinates: 18°59′09″N 97°18′53″W
- Altitude: 4,640 m (15,220 ft)
- Diameter: 50 m (164 ft 1 in)
- Secondary diameter: 2.5 m (8 ft 2 in)
- Collecting area: 1,960 m^{2} (21,100 sq ft)
- Focal length: 525 m (1,722 ft 5 in)
- Website: www.lmtgtm.org
- Location within Mexico
- Related media on Commons

The Large Millimeter Telescope (LMT) (Spanish: Gran Telescopio Milimétrico, or GTM), officially the Large Millimeter Telescope Alfonso Serrano (Spanish: Gran Telescopio Milimétrico Alfonso Serrano), is the world's largest single-aperture telescope in its frequency range, built for observing radio waves in the wave lengths from approximately 0.85 to 4 mm. It has an active surface with a diameter of 50 metres (160 ft) and 1,960 square metres (21,100 sq ft) of collecting area.

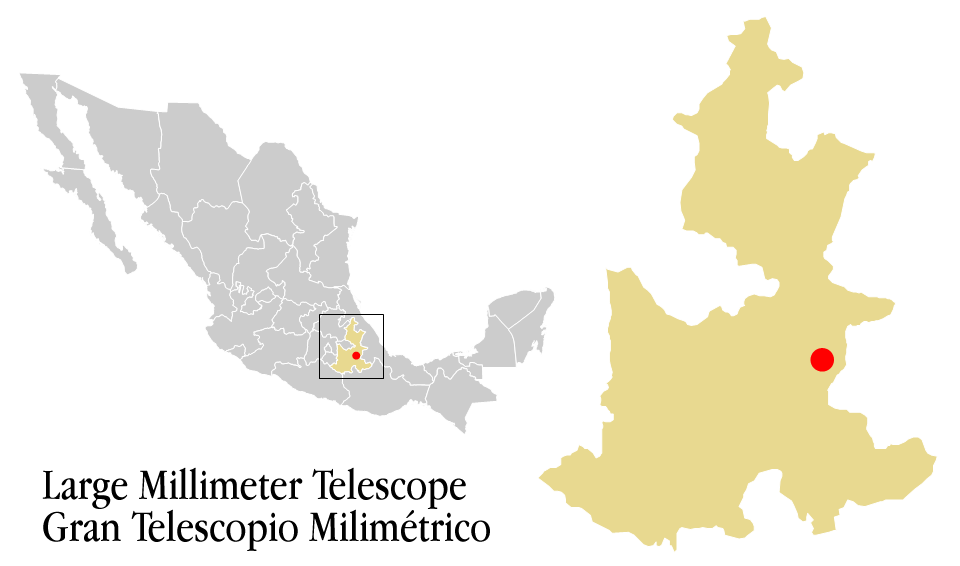
Location of the LMT in Mexico

The telescope is located at an altitude of 4,850 metres (15,910 ft) on top of Sierra Negra, the fifth-highest peak in Mexico and an extinct volcanic companion to Mexico's highest mountain Pico de Orizaba, inside the National Park Pico de Orizaba in the state of Puebla. It is a binational Mexican (70%) – American (30%) joint project of the Instituto Nacional de Astrofísica, Óptica y Electrónica (INAOE) and the University of Massachusetts Amherst.

Millimetre-wavelength observations using the LMT give astronomers a view of regions which are obscured by dust in the interstellar medium, thus increasing our knowledge of star formation. The telescope is also particularly fitted for observing solar system planetesimals and planets as well as extra-solar protoplanetary disks which are relatively cold and emit most of their radiation at millimetre wavelengths.

The mission of the LMT is to: 1) pursue pioneering research, 2) train future generations of scientists and engineers, and 3) develop new technology for the benefit of society. The LMT mainly studies thermally cold objects, most of which are associated with large amounts of cosmic dust and/or molecular gas. Among the objects of interest are comets, planets, protoplanetary discs, evolved stars, star-forming regions and galaxies, molecular clouds, active galactic nuclei (AGNs), high-redshift galaxies, clusters of galaxies, and the cosmic microwave background.

The LMT has a bent Cassegrain optical system with a 50m-diameter reflecting primary surface (M1) formed by 180 segments distributed in five concentric rings. The number of segments in the rings, from the center of the dish to the outside, are: 12, 24 and 48 in the three outermost rings. Each segment is connected to the structure of the telescope through four actuators, allowing for an active reflecting primary surface. In addition, each segment is formed by eight precision electro-formed nickel sub-panels. The reflecting secondary surface (M2) has a 2.6-m diameter, also built by nine electro-formed nickel sub-panels, and is attached to the telescope with an active hexapod that allows precise focus, lateral offsets, and tilts. The hexapod is attached to the telescope through a metal tetrapod. Finally, the reflecting tertiary surface (M3) is almost flat, elliptical with a 1.6-m major axis and delivers the light beam to the receivers.

== History ==
INAOE and UMass-Amherst signed the agreement to develop the Large Millimeter Telescope project on 17 November 1994, but construction of the telescope did not begin until 1998. The first observations were taken in June 2011 at 1.1 and 3 mm using the AzTEC camera and Redshift Search Receiver (RSR), respectively. In May 2013, the Early Science phase began, producing over a dozen scientific articles. The official name of the LMT was changed to "Large Millimeter Telescope Alfonso Serrano" on 22 October 2012 in order to honour the initiator of the project, Alfonso Serrano Pérez-Grovas.

== Instrumentation ==
The set of LMT instrumentation is built by heterodyne receivers and broad-band continuum cameras, some of them still under development:

=== Broad-band continuum ===
TolTEC

TolTEC is a three-band imaging polarimeter which completed laboratory testing and was installed on the LMT in December of 2021, later undergoing commissioning in several phases up to 2023. TolTEC can image the sky at three (1.1, 1.4 and 2.1 millimetre) bands simultaneously using 7000 polarization-sensitive kinetic inductance detectors (KIDs). Each TolTEC observation produces nine independent images - measuring total intensity (I) and two Stokes parameters (Q and U) in all three bands. Because of the nearly ubiquitous presence of dust in our universe, TolTEC's science reach includes cosmology, the physics of clusters, galaxy evolution and star-formation along the history of the Universe, the relation between the star-forming process and the molecular clouds, small bodies of the Solar System, and much more. The instrument is designed to be capable of rapid mapping of the sky and is capable of a rate of mapping in excess of eight times greater than the decommissioned AzTEC instrument. The TolTEC Project is funded by the National Science Foundation (NSF).

=== Heterodyne Receivers ===
SEQUOIA

SEQUOIA operates in the range 85–116 GHz band using a cryogenic focal-plane array of 32 pixels arranged in dual-polarized 4×4 arrays fed by square horns separated by 2 fλ. The arrays are cooled to 18K and use low-noise Indium Phosphide (InP) monolithic microwave integrated circuit (MMIC) preamplifiers designed at UMass to provide a characteristic receiver noise of 55K in the range 85–107 GHz, increasing to 90K at 116 GHz.

Redshift Search Receiver (RSR)

A novel MMIC-based receiver designed to maximize the instantaneous receiver bandwidth to cover the 90 GHz atmospheric window from 75 to 110 GHz in a single tuning. The receiver has four pixels arranged in a dual-beam and dual polarized configuration. Orthogonal polarizations are combined in waveguide-based orthomode transducers. Beam-switching at 1 kHz on the sky is achieved using a fast Faraday rotation polarization switch and a wire-grid to interchange the reflected and transmitted beams to each receiver. This ultra-wide-band receiver typically achieves noise temperatures < 50K between 75 and 110 GHz. The Redshift Search Receiver has exceptional baseline stability because it does not involve mechanical moving parts, therefore being well-suited to the detection of redshifted transitions of the CO ladder from star-forming galaxies at cosmological distances. An innovative wide-band analog autocorrelator system which covers the full 38 GHz with 31 MHz (100 km/s at 90 GHz) resolution serves as the backed spectrometer.

=== Decommissioned ===
AzTEC

The AzTEC millimetre camera was developed to operate at 1.1mm. It is formed by a 144 silicon nitride micromesh bolometer array arranged in a compact hexagonal package and fed by an array of horns separated by 1.4 fλ. The detectors are cooled down to ~250 mK inside a 3He closed-cycle cryostat, achieving a ~3 mJy Hz-1/2 pixel sensibility. The AzTEC field of view at the LMT is 2.4 arcminutes square and manages to take completely sampled images through telescope or reflecting secondary surface movements.
