= Atmosphere and Telescope Simulator =

Atmosphere and Telescope Simulators for astronomy education, are used because time in science-worthy class telescopes are generally expensive and difficult to obtain. Telescope facilities are often uncomfortable for operators working for long periods of time. In addition, Atmosphere and Telescope Simulators can be used to test new adaptive optics systems before using them on real telescopes. Researchers have expressed the need for a laboratory tool which could provide better and cheaper accessibility than a real telescope, and better characterization than computer simulations. A LED based illumination system in which five Galilean collimation systems have been used is reported on. It is part of a turbulence simulator for the evaluation of ground telescope instrumentation developed by INTA (optics) and LIDAX (opto-mechanics) for the IAC called IACATS.

The IACATS instrument simulates a scene consisting of a set of different binary stars simulating the required angular separation between them, and their spectral characteristics. As a result, a visible and infrared multi-spectral illumination system has been integrated as a part of the turbulence simulator. A wave front sensor enables to evaluate the deformation that the phase plates, or the simulated turbulence, produce in the wave front coming from the illumination system and star simulator. Finally, a specific illumination system includes different working wavelengths.

Different scenes are simulated from three main controlled parameters:

- Stars Light
- Atmospheric turbulences
- Telescope focal plane

== See also ==
- List of observatories
- List of telescope types
