= Beam park =

Radar for space surveillance

Beam park is a radar mode used for space surveillance, particularly tracking space debris. In beam-park mode, a radar beam is kept in a fixed direction with respect to the Earth, while objects passing through the beam are tracked. In 24 hours, as a result of the Earth’s rotation, the radar effectively scans a narrow strip through 360° of the celestial sphere. The scattered waves are detected by a receiver and the measurements obtained during the observations can be used to determine object radar cross-section, time of peak occurrence, polarization ratio, doppler shift and object rotation. The obtained information for each object is then processed and matched against data from previously catalogued objects. The beam-park mode can be used to detect both previously known and uncatalogued objects at any altitude, provided that the reflected power captured by the receiver can be distinguished from the noise. This limits the use of radar-based beam park observations to objects in Low-Earth Orbit (LEO). Optical instruments, in turn, have very good performance for objects in Geostationary Earth Orbit (GEO) and in Geostationary Transfer Orbit (GTO). The radar technique typically outperforms optical facilities in LEO and can conduct observations for longer periods, both during day and night, independently of the weather and object illumination by sunlight.

The tracking sensitivity of radar-based space debris tracking systems can be further improved if they are working in conjunction with another transmitter or receiver, forming a bistatic radar system.

== History ==
Several US radars were the first to start carrying out beam-park tracking. These were the Haystack Radar in Massachusetts, Goldstone Radar in California, and multiple radars at the Kwajalein Atoll. Most notable, the Haystack radar is capable of tracking objects as small as 2 mm.

The first known European beam-park experiments were carried out by the German TIRA system in 1993. Performing observations in the L-band during a 10-hour long experiment, the system was able to detect small-sized objects in LEO. The first 24-hour operational measurement campaign was performed on 13–14 December 1994, with TIRA and the Fylingdales Phased-Array Radar. TIRA can also be used as a transmitter, part of a bistatic system, in conjunction with the Effelsberg Radio Telescope, functioning as a receiver, where the combined system has a detection size threshold of 1 cm.

Dedicated space surveillance sensors, often operating in beam-park mode, include the French GRAVES bistatic radar, the defunct US Air Force Space Surveillance System (Space Fence) and its replacement Space Fence. Other systems currently used for space surveillance that operate in beam-park mode include the multistatic EISCAT incoherent scatter radar system and the Medicina Radio Observatory's Northern Cross Radio Telescope and 32 m parabolic dish antenna.

== See also ==
- ESA Space Situational Awareness Programme
- US Space Surveillance Network
- Kessler syndrome
