= Astro Space Center (Russia) =

This enclave of scientific research is officially known as Astro Space Center of PN Lebedev Physics Institute, (ASC LPI, Russian: Астрокосмический центр Физического института Академии Наук) and is under the purview of the Russian Academy of Sciences. Generally speaking, the space center's mission focuses on astrophysics, which includes cosmology. The emphasis is on accomplishing basic research in this science. The research leads into exploring the composition, and structure of astronomical objects, interstellar and interplanetary space along with exploring how these evolved.

== ASC divisions ==
The Astro Space Center is separated into three divisions, two of which are national observatories. These three divisions are the " Moscow branch", the Pushchino Radio Astronomy Observatory, and Kalyazin Radio Astronomy Observatory. The ASC divisions accomplish research, and achieve scientific milestones, and perform administrative duties as well.

=== Moscow branch ===
The Moscow branch (55.6544°N 37.5334°E) is itself divided into approximately eight divisions. These branches conduct research in Theoretical physics, the thermal history of the universe, (Note: Division of Quantum Astrophysics and MS Burgin, VL Kautz, NN Shakhvorostova "On the influence of shock transitions on cosmological hydrogen recombination spectrum" Astronomy Letters, v. 32, p. 1 (2006).) various properties of extragalactic objects, (Note: Space Radio Astronomy, and AE Volvach et al, "Variability of radiation blazar 3С454.3 for the period 40 years," Astronomical Journal, 2007, Volume 84, № 6, pp. 503-513.) and design and development of space and astronomy research equipment (Note: Department of Space Electronics)

=== Pushchino Radio Astronomy Observatory ===
Another division of ASC LPI is the Pushchino observatory, at 54.8232°N 37.6331°E. It has an array of antennas running N-S and E-W, and produced a fan beam in the sky. It is sited near Pushchino.

It employs 45 researchers along with 60 engineers and technicians to accomplish staff the several major departments and several labs of the observatory. These are combined with 80 other people who perform administrative duties, workshops, garage, and a staff of guards. The departments and labs are designed to focus on scientific and technical aspects of observatory sciences.

The departments are as follows: Plasma astrophysics, Extragalactic radio astronomy, Pulsar physics, Space radio spectroscopy, and Pulsar astrometry. The laboratories are as follows: Radio astronomy equipment, Automation radio astronomy research, Computer engineering and information technology, and Radio telescopes of the meter wavelength range.

=== Kalyazin Radio Astronomy Observatory ===
Another, third division, is the Kalyazin Radio Astronomy Observatory, at 57.2231°N 37.9004°E.

== Achievements of the ASC ==
The ASC has led the development and deployment of an international VLBI project. It is called the RadioAstron. VLBI stands for (Very Long Baseline Interferometry), for radio astronomy. It allows observations of an object that are made simultaneously by many telescopes to be combined, emulating a telescope with a size equal to the maximum separation between the telescopes.

=== Notable works ===
The following are notable works published in affiliation with Russia's Astro Space Center:

- Ivanov, P. (August 2001). "Dynamics of a tidally disrupted star". Astronomical & Astrophysical Transactions. 20 (2): 267–270. Bibcode:2001A&AT...20..267I. doi:10.1080/10556790108229708.
