= Cagliari Observatory =

Observatory in Sardinia, Italy

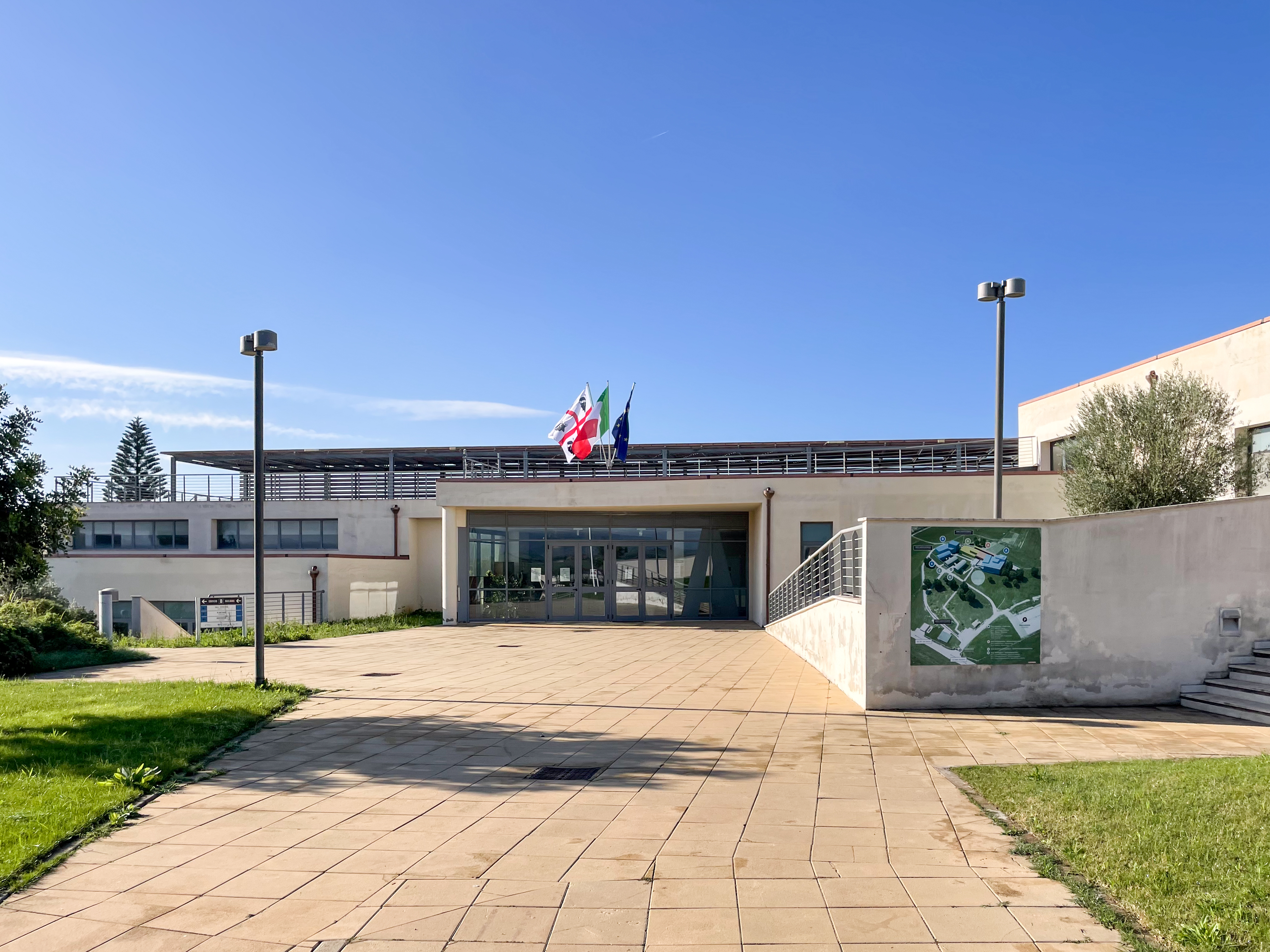
- Alternative names: OAC
- Organization: National Institute for Astrophysics
- Location: Cagliari, Metropolitan City of Cagliari, Sardinia, Italy
- Coordinates: 39°16′55″N 9°07′53″E
- Website: www.oa-cagliari.inaf.it
- Telescopes: Sardinia Radio Telescope
- Location of Cagliari Observatory
- Related media on Commons

The Cagliari Observatory (Italian: Osservatorio Astronomico di Cagliari, or OAC) is an astronomical observatory owned and operated by Italy's Istituto Nazionale di Astrofisica (National Institute for Astrophysics, INAF). It is located 20 km away from Cagliari in Sardinia. It was founded in 1899 to study the Earth's rotation.

== See also ==
- List of astronomical observatories
