= Active surface =

Telescope functions

An active surface is a surface of a radio telescope that is under active computer control of its shape.

Large radio telescopes (more than 10 m in diameter or length) always bend during operation, due to their enormous weight and the fact that even the strongest materials are not perfectly stiff. This bending, in the range of a few millimetres, does not affect low frequency operation much, but dramatically reduces the efficiency of the telescope at higher frequencies where the wavelengths are comparable to the distortion. Typically, the efficiency of a telescope drops appreciably when the deviation from the desired shape is more than 1/10 of the considered wavelength. An active surface uses numerous small actuators to move the surface panels with respect to the underlying frame, and thus maintain the correct shape.

An active surface can try to compensate for many different types of errors. The first is gravity—this is simplest since previous measurements, or even a mathematical model, can be used to predict (and correct) any bending. More difficult is correction for wind and thermal errors, since these require measuring and correcting in real time.

Some examples of active surfaces are:

- Green Bank Telescope
- Large Millimeter Telescope
- Sardinia Radio Telescope
- Noto Radio Observatory

The Chinese Five hundred meter Aperture Spherical Telescope uses an ambitious form of active surface, not only correcting errors, but applying deflections of up to 47 centimetres (19 in) in order to aim and focus the telescope.

== See also ==
- Active optics
