= Spektr-UV =

Proposed ultraviolet space telescope

Spektr-UV Спектр-УФ
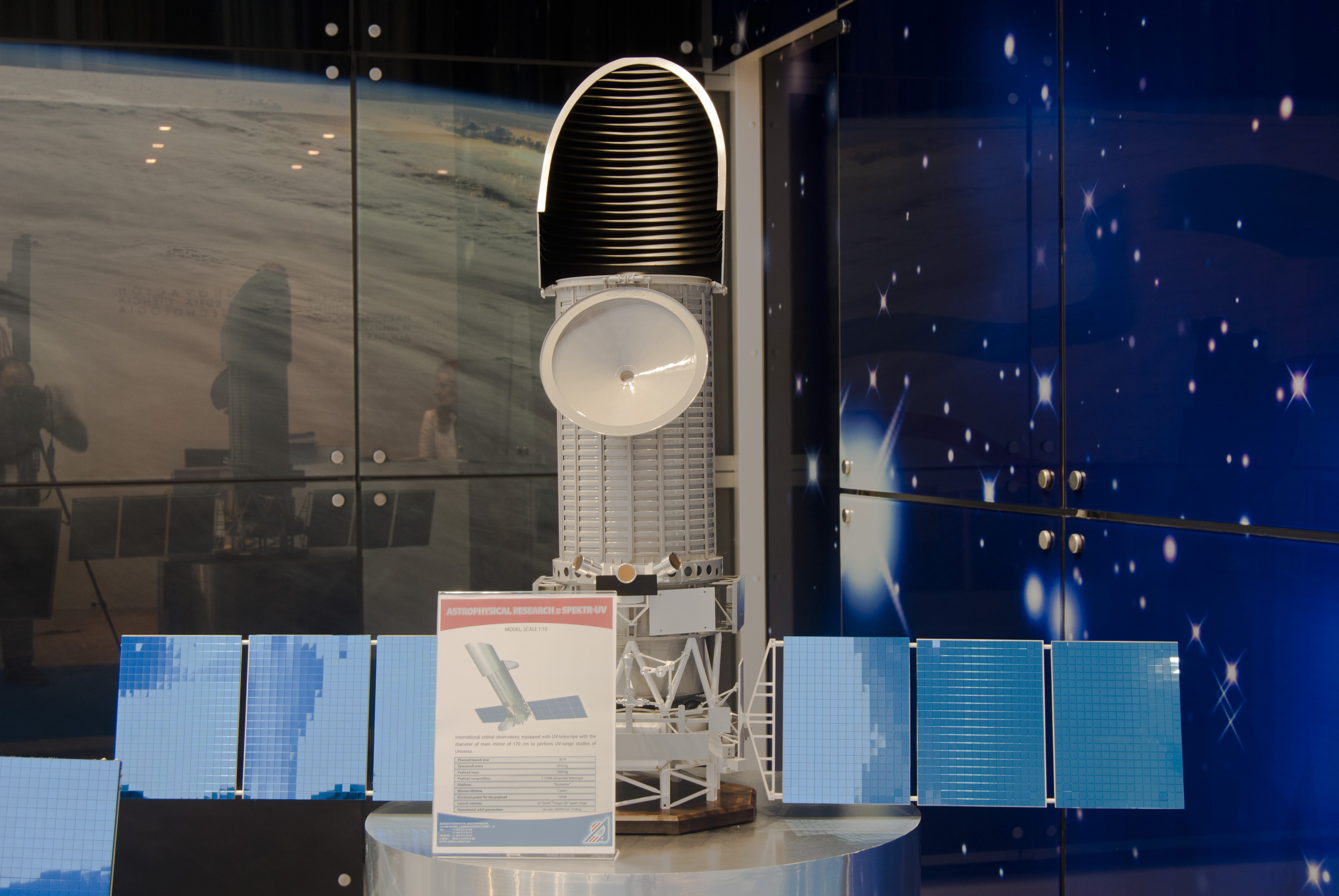
- Model of WSO-UV telescope during "Space Week" in Madrid, May 2011
- Mission type: Space telescope
- Operator: Russian Astro Space Center

Spacecraft properties
- Manufacturer: NPO Lavochkin
- Payload mass: 2,840 kg (6,261 lb)

Start of mission
- Launch date: 2031 (proposed)
- Rocket: Angara A5M
- Launch site: Vostochny Site 1A
- Contractor: Roscosmos

Main telescope
- Wavelengths: 115 to 315 nm

Spektr-UV, also known as World Space Observatory-Ultraviolet (WSO-UV), is a proposed ultraviolet space telescope intended for work in the 115 nm to 315 nm wavelength range. It is an international project led by Russia (Roscosmos), with participation from Spain and Japan. The launch had initially been planned for 2007, but has since been continually delayed; as of January 2026, the launch is expected to take place no earlier than 2031 atop an Angara A5M rocket from Vostochny Cosmodrome.

== Overview ==
The main instrument of the observatory is a 1.7-metre Ritchey–Chrétien telescope. The telescope will be equipped with the following instruments:

=== WSO-UV Spectrographs Unit (WUVS) (Russia/Japan) ===
The WUVS spectrographs assembly consists of four channels:

- Vacuum Ultraviolet Echelle Spectrograph, VUVES (Russia): The FUV high-resolution spectrograph (VUVES) provides echelle spectroscopy capabilities with high resolution (R ~ 50 000) in the 115–176 nm range.
- Ultraviolet Echelle Spectrograph, UVES (Russia): The NUV high-resolution spectrograph (UVES) provides echelle spectroscopy capabilities with R ~ 50 000 in the 174–310 nm range.
- Long-Slit Spectrograph, LSS (Russia): The Long-Slit Spectrograph (LSS) provides low resolution (R ~ 1000), long slit spectroscopy in the 115–305 nm range. The spatial resolution is better than 0.5 arcsec(0.1 arcsec as the best value).
- UV Spectrograph for observation of Earth-like Exoplanets, UVSPEX (Japan)

=== WSO-UV Field Camera Unit (FCU) (Russia/Spain) ===
The FCU has two channels, each fed by an independent pick off mirror:

- Field Camera Unit FUV channel (FCU/FUV) (Russia/Spain): The far UV (FUV) channel has capabilities for high resolution imaging through the MCP detector, scale 0,047 arcsec/pixel in 115–190 nm range.
- Field Camera Unit UVO channel (FCU/UVO) (Russia): The UV-optical (UVO) channel is designed for wide field imaging through the CCD detector, scale 0,146 arcsec/pixel in 185–810 nm range.

=== Proposed and former instruments ===
- Stellar Coronograph for Exoplanet Direct Imaging, SCEDI (NAOJ, Rikkyo University, Japan).
- HIRDES (High-Resolution Double Echelle Spectrograph): R~55000 spectroscopy of point sources in the 102–320 nm range (Germany). Germany exited the Spektr-UV programme due to financial problems, so Russia replaced HIRDES with WUVES.
- ISSIS (Imaging and Slitless Spectroscopy Instrument for Surveys) was being developed to carry out UV and optical diffraction limited imaging of astronomical objects. The ISSIS would have incorporated three channels: High Sensitivity Far-UV Channel: 120–200 nm; Channel for Surveys (FUV): 120–600 nm, optimized for 120–270 nm; Channel for Surveys (UVO): 120–600 nm, optimized for 270–600 nm (Spain). Due to financial problems, Spain canceled ISSIS, and limited participation in Spektr-UV program to ground segment and supply of detectors for FCU. Russia replaced ISSIS with FCU.

== History ==
In October 2012, tests of antennas for the space telescope were completed.

In July 2019, INASAN selected the first seven experiments to be performed by the observatory.

== Participating nations ==
Spektr-UV is an international project led by Russia (Roscosmos). At present the international cooperation includes three basic participants: Russia (will provide the telescope, spacecraft, launch facilities, ground segment); Spain (FCU detectors, ground segment); Japan (UVSPEX).

== See also ==
- List of proposed space observatories
