= Noto Radio Observatory =

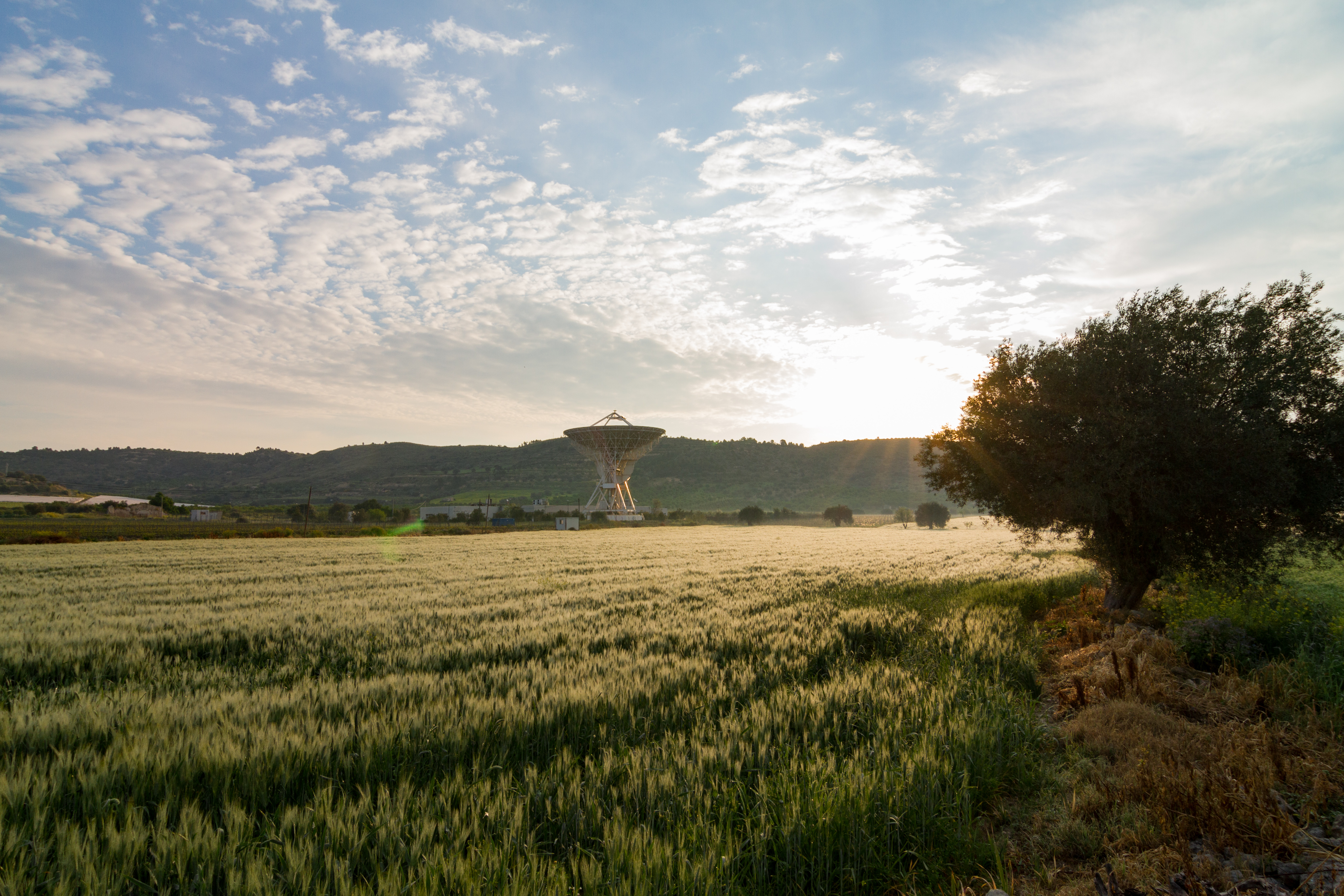
- Location: Sicily, Italy
- Coordinates: 36°52′34″N 14°59′21″E
- Website: www.noto.ira.inaf.it
- Telescopes: Noto 32-m radio telescope
- Location of Noto Radio Observatory

The Noto VLBI Station is a radio observatory located on Sicily, southern Italy, outside the city of Noto. The facility is operated by the Istituto di Radioastronomia di Bologna.

The antenna is a 32-metre diameter paraboloid fitted with an active surface and receivers for astronomy observations from 1 to 86 GHz. The Noto antenna is used in conjunction with other antennas throughout Europe and the world for VLBI.

== See also ==
- Istituto di Radioastronomia di Bologna
- List of radio telescopes
- Medicina Radio Observatory
- EVN
