= San Basilio, Sardinia =

San Basilio Santu 'Asili 'e Monti
- Comune
- Comune di San Basilio
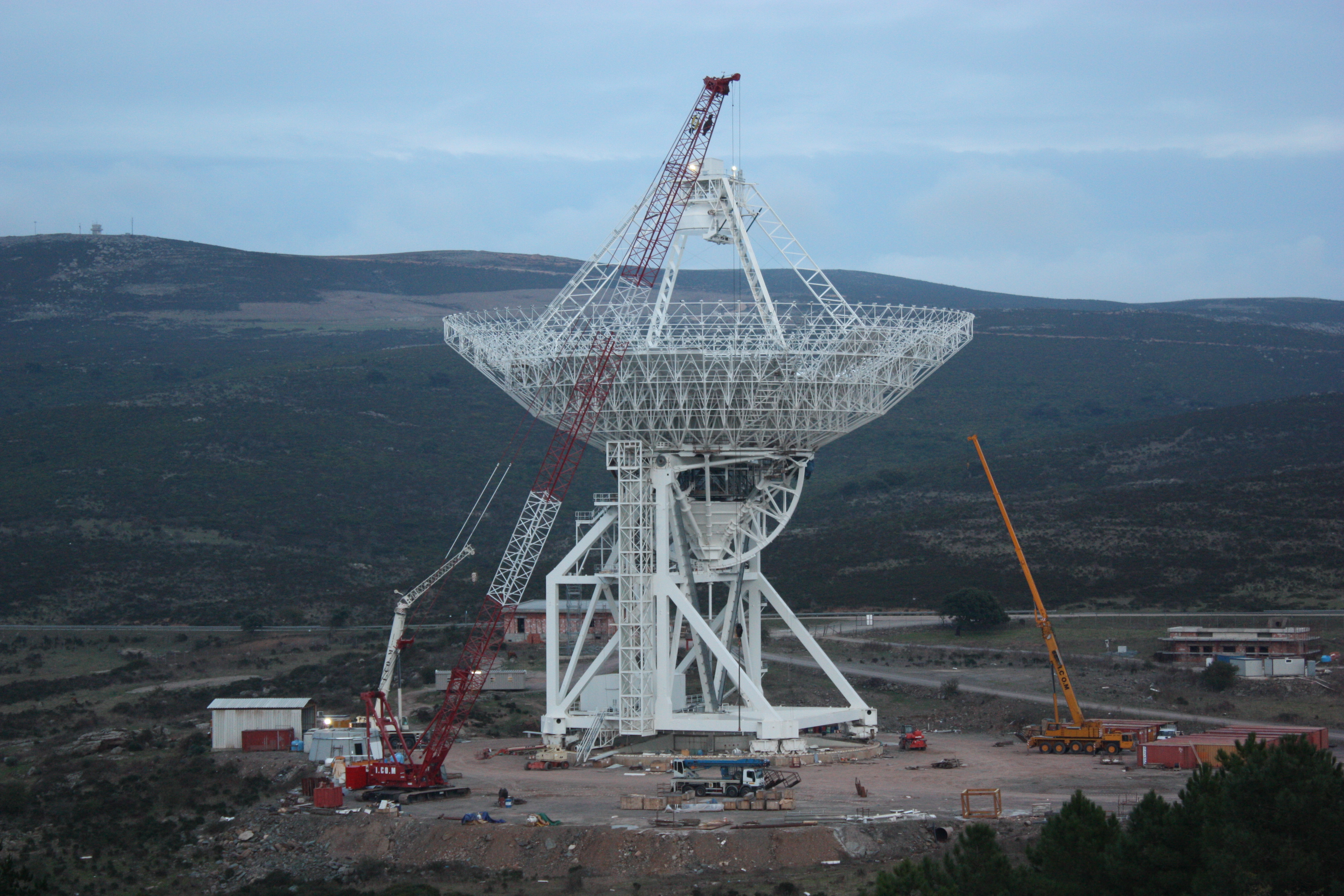
- The Sardinia Radio Telescope (SRT) under construction

- Location within Sardinia
- Coordinates: 39°32′N 9°12′E
- Country: Italy
- Region: Sardinia
- Metropolitan city: Cagliari (CA)

Area
  - Total: 44.9 km^{2} (17.3 sq mi)

Population (December 2004)
  - Total: 1,371
  - Density: 30.5/km^{2} (79.1/sq mi)
- Time zone: UTC+1 (CET)
  - Summer (DST): UTC+2 (CEST)
- Postal code: 09040
- Dialing code: 070

San Basilio (Sardinian: Santu 'Asili 'e Monti) is a commune in the Metropolitan City of Cagliari, region of Sardinia, Italy, about 35 km (22 mi) north of Cagliari. As of 31 December 2004, it has a population of 1,371 and an area of 44.9 km^{2} (17.3 sq mi).

San Basilio borders the municipalities of San Nicolò Gerrei, Sant'Andrea Frius, Senorbì, Silius, and Siurgus Donigala.

== Demographic evolution ==
Historical population

Year	Pop.	±%
1861	1,291	—
1871	1,165	−9.8%
1881	1,161	−0.3%
1901	1,136	−2.2%
1911	1,160	+2.1%

Year	Pop.	±%
1921	1,041	−10.3%
1931	1,147	+10.2%
1936	1,279	+11.5%
1951	1,293	+1.1%
1961	1,488	+15.1%

Year	Pop.	±%
1971	1,512	+1.6%
1981	1,497	−1.0%
1991	1,459	−2.5%
2001	1,414	−3.1%

Source: Data from ISTAT

== See also ==
- Sardinia Radio Telescope
