= National Institute for Astrophysics =

Italian research institute

- Istituto Nazionale di Astrofisica
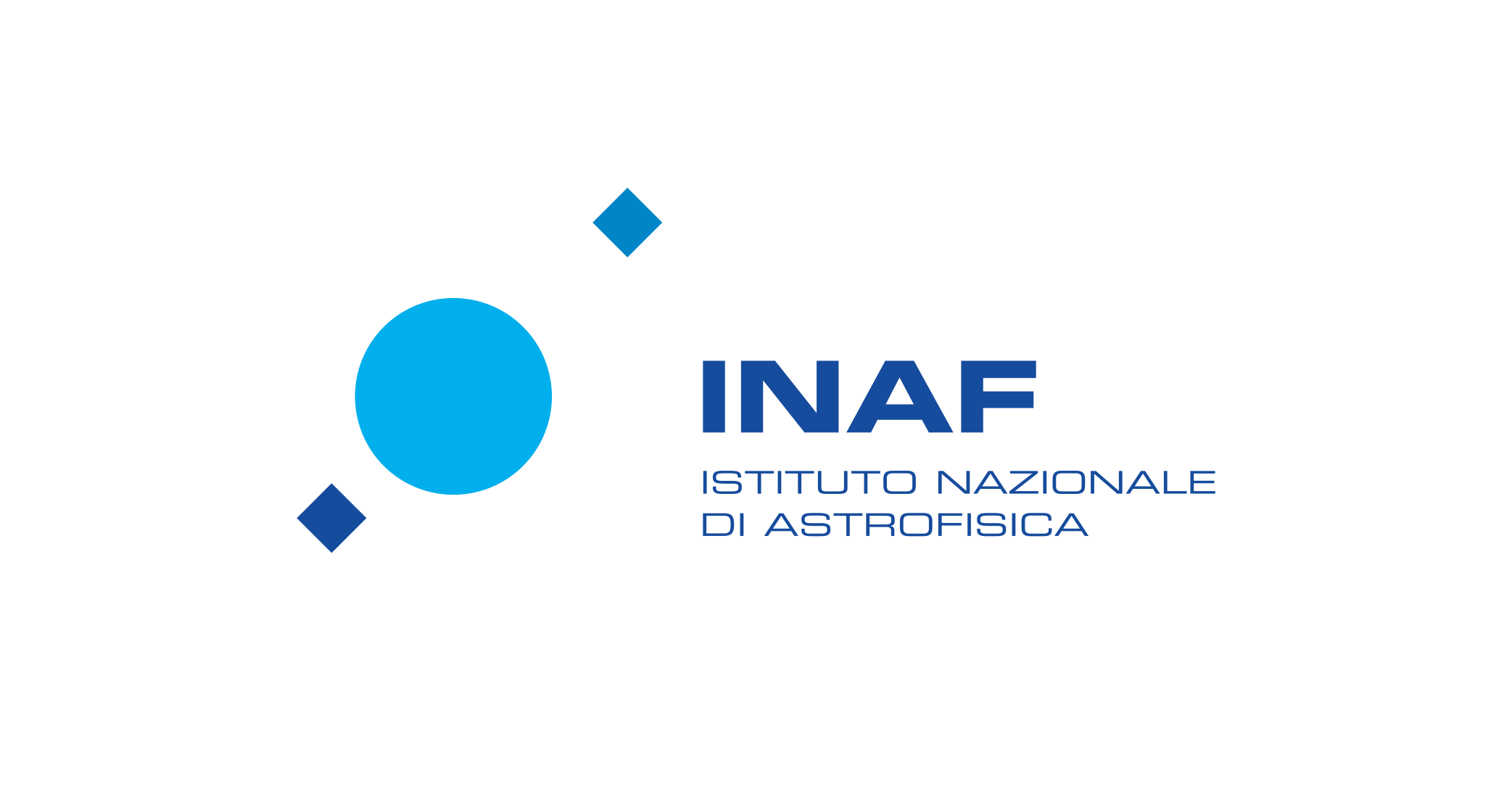
- Established: 1999
- President: Roberto Ragazzoni
- Staff: ~1,400
- Location: Rome, Italy
- Website: www.inaf.it/en

The National Institute for Astrophysics (Istituto nazionale di astrofisica, INAF) is the principal Italian public research institution for astronomy and astrophysics. Headquartered in Rome, INAF coordinates, promotes, and manages scientific research activities in astronomy, astrophysics, space physics, and planetary science across 16 research structures throughout Italy.

INAF collaborates internationally with major space agencies and astronomical organizations, including the European Southern Observatory (ESO), the European Space Agency (ESA), and NASA.

== History ==
INAF was established by the Italian government in 1999 (Decree Law No. 238/1999) to unify the activities of Italy's astronomical observatories under a single national coordination body.

In 2005, following Legislative Decree No. 138/2003, INAF underwent a major reorganization, absorbing two institutes previously belonging to the National Research Council (CNR):

- The Institute for Space Astrophysics and Cosmic Physics (IASF)
- The Institute for Interplanetary Space Physics (IFSI)

This integration expanded INAF's scope from optical and radio astronomy to include space astrophysics, high-energy astrophysics, and planetary exploration.

== Research facilities ==
INAF's nationwide network consists of 16 operating units, including historical observatories and specialized research institutes:

- Bologna: Observatory of Astrophysics and Space Science (OAS) and Institute of Radio Astronomy (IRA)
- Cagliari: Astronomical Observatory of Cagliari (OAC)
- Catania: Astrophysical Observatory of Catania (OACT)
- Florence: Arcetri Astrophysical Observatory (OAA)
- Milan: Astronomical Observatory of Brera (OAB) and Institute for Space Astrophysics and Cosmic Physics of Milan (IASF-Milano)
- Naples: Astronomical Observatory of Capodimonte (OACN)
- Padua: Astronomical Observatory of Padua (OAPD)
- Palermo: Astronomical Observatory of Palermo (OAPa) and Institute for Space Astrophysics and Cosmic Physics of Palermo (IASF-Palermo)
- Rome: Astronomical Observatory of Rome (OAR) and Institute for Space Astrophysics and Planetology (IAPS)
- Teramo: Abruzzo Astronomical Observatory (OAAb)
- Turin: Astrophysical Observatory of Turin (OATO)
- Trieste: Astronomical Observatory of Trieste (OATS)

== Main telescopes and instrumentation ==
INAF operates and contributes to several major observational facilities worldwide, both ground-based and space-borne:

=== Ground-based observatories ===
- Telescopio Nazionale Galileo (TNG): A 3.58-meter optical/near-infrared telescope located at the Roque de los Muchachos Observatory in La Palma, Canary Islands, Spain.
- Large Binocular Telescope (LBT): A dual 8.4-meter mirror telescope located on Mount Graham, Arizona (USA), operated in partnership with US and German institutions.
- Medicina Radio Observatory: Located near Bologna, housing a 32-meter parabolic dish and the Northern Cross Radio Telescope.
- Noto Radio Observatory: Located in Sicily, operating a 32-meter parabolic dish.
- Sardinia Radio Telescope (SRT): A 64-meter fully steerable radio telescope located in San Basilio, Sardinia.

=== International collaborations ===
INAF is heavily involved in major global astronomical projects, including:

- European Southern Observatory (ESO): Contributing to facilities such as the Very Large Telescope (VLT) and the upcoming Extremely Large Telescope (ELT).
- Square Kilometre Array (SKA): Playing a key role in the design and construction of the world's largest radio telescope.
- Cherenkov Telescope Array (CTA): Contributing to high-energy gamma-ray astronomy.

=== Space missions ===
INAF develops scientific instruments and processes data for numerous international space missions in partnership with ESA, NASA, ASI (Italian Space Agency), and JAXA, including:

- Gaia, Euclid, JUICE, BepiColombo, Solar Orbiter, James Webb Space Telescope, IXPE and CHEOPS.

== Outreach and education ==
INAF is actively engaged in public engagement, science communication, and educational activities to promote scientific culture across Italy and internationally. In addition to organizing public events, school visits, and observational nights at its regional observatories, the institute operates several specialized platforms and publications dedicated to education and outreach:

- Media INAF: INAF's official online daily news portal covering breakthroughs in astrophysics and space sciences for the general public and media outlets.
- EduINAF: Launched as INAF's online educational magazine, EduINAF offers astronomical news, teaching resources, interactive workshops, and live observational broadcasts tailored for teachers, students, and science enthusiasts.
- Play INAF: A platform dedicated to innovative and digital pedagogy, focusing on game-based learning, educational robotics, coding, and hands-on activities to teach astrophysics. In 2023, Play INAF received the CLASSified Award for technological innovation in digital education.
- Universi: A biannual print magazine publishing news, feature articles, and insights on astronomy, space exploration, and INAF's public outreach initiatives. It's also available online.

== See also ==
- Italian Space Agency (ASI)
- National Research Council (CNR)
- European Southern Observatory (ESO)
- European Space Agency (ESA)
