= Very-long-baseline interferometry =

Comparing widely separated telescope wavefronts

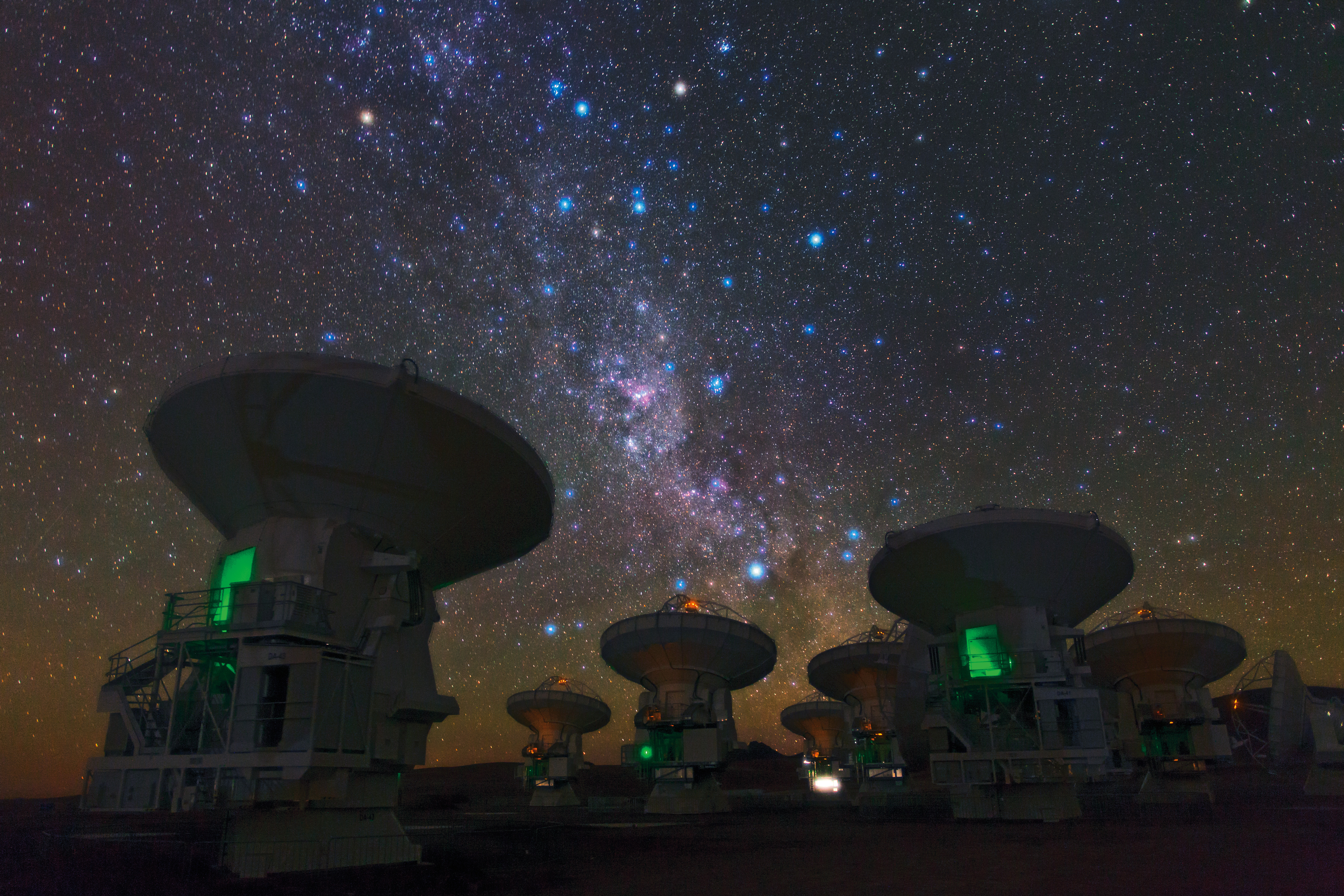
Some of the Atacama Large Millimeter Array radio telescopes

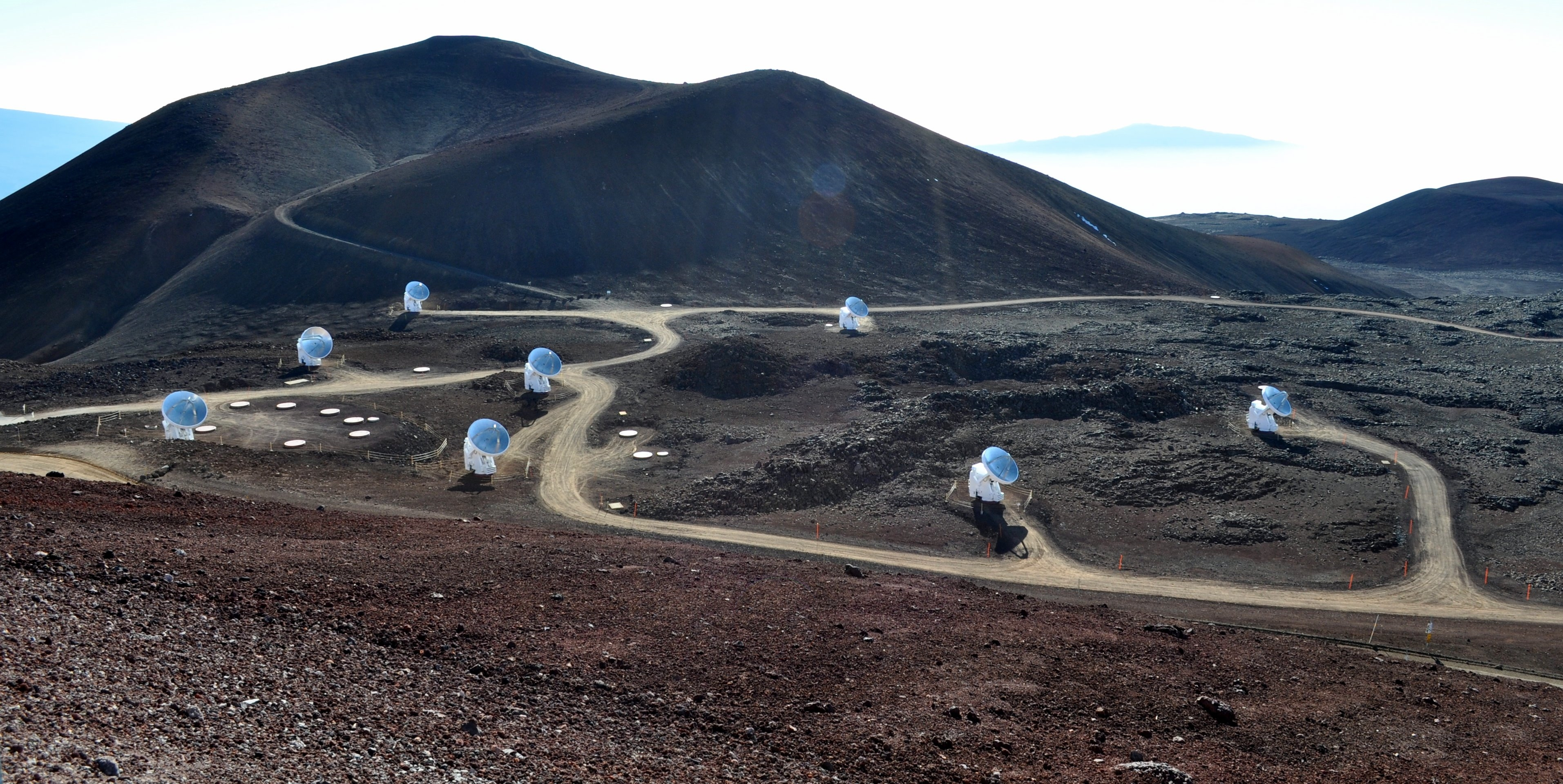
The eight radio telescopes of the Smithsonian Submillimeter Array, located at the Mauna Kea Observatory in Hawai'i

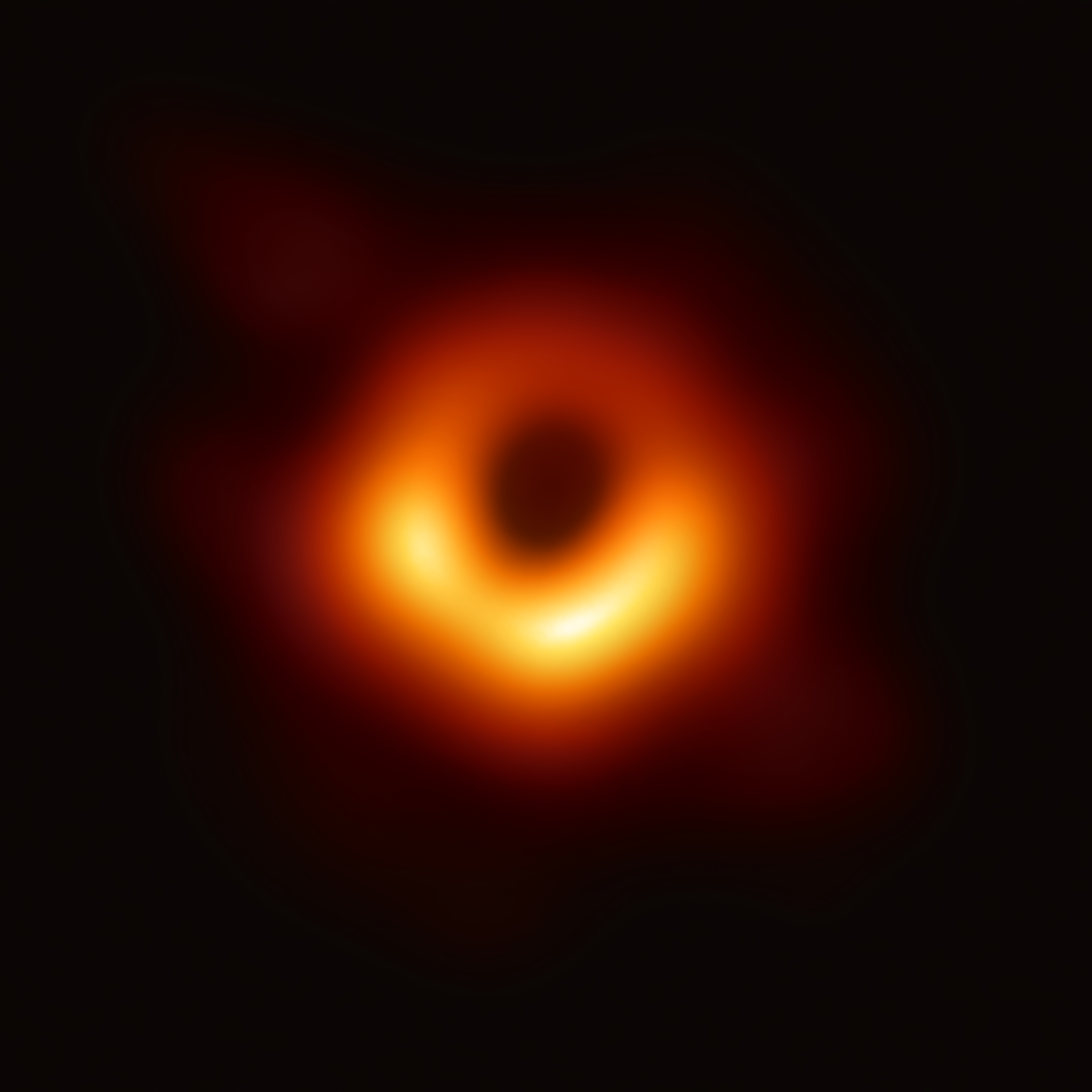
VLBI was used to create the first image of a black hole, imaged by the Event Horizon Telescope and published in April 2019.

Very-long-baseline interferometry (VLBI) is a type of astronomical interferometry used in radio astronomy. In VLBI a signal from an astronomical radio source, such as a quasar, is collected at multiple radio telescopes on Earth or in space. The distance between the radio telescopes is then calculated using the time difference between the arrivals of the radio signal at different telescopes. This allows observations of an object that are made simultaneously by many radio telescopes to be combined, emulating a telescope with a size equal to the maximum separation between the telescopes.

Data received at each antenna in the array include arrival times from a local atomic clock, such as a hydrogen maser. At a later time, the data are correlated with data from other antennas that recorded the same radio signal, to produce the resulting image. The resolution achievable using interferometry is proportional to the observing frequency. The VLBI technique enables the distance between telescopes to be much greater than that possible with conventional interferometry, which requires antennas to be physically connected by coaxial cable, waveguide, optical fiber, or other type of transmission line. The greater telescope separations are possible in VLBI due to the development of the closure phase imaging technique by Roger Jennison in the 1950s, allowing VLBI to produce images with superior resolution.

VLBI is best known for imaging distant cosmic radio sources, spacecraft tracking, and for applications in astrometry. However, since the VLBI technique measures the time differences between the arrival of radio waves at separate antennas, it can also be used "in reverse" to perform Earth rotation studies, map movements of tectonic plates very precisely (within millimetres), and perform other types of geodesy. Using VLBI in this manner requires large numbers of time difference measurements from distant sources (such as quasars) observed with a global network of antennas over a period of time.

== Method ==
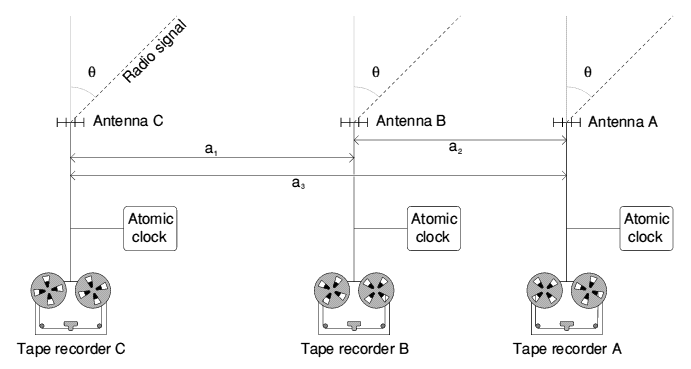
Recording data at each of the telescopes in a VLBI array. Extremely accurate high-frequency clocks are recorded alongside the astronomical data in order to help get the synchronization correct

In VLBI, the digitized antenna data are usually recorded at each of the telescopes. (In the past this was done on large magnetic tapes, but nowadays it is usually done on large arrays of computer disk drives.) The antenna signal is sampled with an extremely precise and stable atomic clock (usually a hydrogen maser) that is additionally locked onto a GPS time standard. Alongside the astronomical data samples, the output of this clock is recorded. The recorded media are then transported to a central location. More recent experiments have been conducted with "electronic" VLBI (e-VLBI) where the data are sent by fibre-optics (e.g., 10 Gbit/s fiber-optic paths in the European GEANT2 research network) and not recorded at the telescopes, speeding up and simplifying the observing process significantly. Even though the data rates are very high, the data can be sent over normal Internet connections taking advantage of the fact that many of the international high speed networks have significant spare capacity at present.

At the location of the correlator, the data is played back. The timing of the playback is adjusted according to the atomic clock signals, and the estimated times of arrival of the radio signal at each of the telescopes. A range of playback timings over a range of nanoseconds are usually tested until the correct timing is found.

Playing back the data from each of the telescopes in a VLBI array. Great care must be taken to synchronize the play back of the data from different telescopes. Atomic clock signals recorded with the data help in getting the timing correct.

Each antenna will be a different distance from the radio source, and as with the short baseline radio interferometer the delays incurred by the extra distance to one antenna must be added artificially to the signals received at each of the other antennas. The approximate delay required can be calculated from the geometry of the problem. The tape playback is synchronized using the recorded signals from the atomic clocks as time references, as shown in the drawing on the right. If the position of the antennas is not known to sufficient accuracy or atmospheric effects are significant, fine adjustments to the delays must be made until interference fringes are detected. If the signal from antenna A is taken as the reference, inaccuracies in the delay will lead to errors $\epsilon_{B}$ and $\epsilon_{C}$ in the phases of the signals from tapes B and C respectively (see drawing on right). As a result of these errors the phase of the complex visibility cannot be measured with a very-long-baseline interferometer.

Temperature variations at VLBI sites can deform the structure of the antennas and affect the baseline measurements. Neglecting atmospheric pressure and hydrological loading corrections at the observation level can also contaminate the VLBI measurements by introducing annual and seasonal signals, like in the Global Navigation Satellite System time series.

The phase of the complex visibility depends on the symmetry of the source brightness distribution. Any brightness distribution can be written as the sum of a symmetric component and an anti-symmetric component. The symmetric component of the brightness distribution only contributes to the real part of the complex visibility, while the anti-symmetric component only contributes to the imaginary part. As the phase of each complex visibility measurement cannot be determined with a very-long-baseline interferometer the symmetry of the corresponding contribution to the source brightness distributions is not known.

Roger Clifton Jennison developed a novel technique for obtaining information about visibility phases when delay errors are present, using an observable called the closure phase. Although his initial laboratory measurements of closure phase had been done at optical wavelengths, he foresaw greater potential for his technique in radio interferometry. In 1958 he demonstrated its effectiveness with a radio interferometer, but it only became widely used for long-baseline radio interferometry in 1974. At least three antennas are required. This method was used for the first VLBI measurements, and a modified form of this approach ("Self-Calibration") is still used today.

== Scientific results ==
Geodesist Chopo Ma explains some of the geodetic uses of VLBI.

Some of the scientific results derived from VLBI include:

- High resolution radio imaging of cosmic radio sources, including active galactic nuclei.
- Imaging the surfaces of nearby stars at radio wavelengths (see also interferometry) – similar techniques have also been used to make infrared and optical images of stellar surfaces.
- Definition of the celestial reference frame.
- Measurement of the acceleration of the Solar System toward the center of the Milky Way.
- Motion of the Earth's tectonic plates.
- Regional deformation and local uplift or subsidence.
- Earth's orientation parameters and fluctuations in the length of day.
- Maintenance of the terrestrial reference frame.
- Measurement of gravitational forces of the Sun and Moon on the Earth and the deep structure of the Earth.
- Improvement of atmospheric models.
- Measurement of the fundamental speed of gravity.
- The tracking of the Huygens probe as it passed through Titan's atmosphere, allowing wind velocity measurements.
- First imaging of a supermassive black hole.

== VLBI arrays ==
There are several VLBI arrays located in Europe, Canada, the United States, Chile, Russia, China, South Korea, Japan, Mexico, Australia and Thailand. The most sensitive VLBI array in the world is the European VLBI Network (EVN). This is a part-time array that brings together the largest European radiotelescopes and some others outside of Europe for typically weeklong sessions, with the data being processed at the Joint Institute for VLBI in Europe (JIVE). The Very Long Baseline Array (VLBA), which uses ten dedicated, 25-meter telescopes spanning 5351 miles across the United States, is the largest VLBI array that operates all year round as both an astronomical and geodesy instrument. The combination of the EVN and VLBA is known as Global VLBI. When one or both of these arrays are combined with space-based VLBI antennas such as HALCA or Spektr-R, the resolution obtained is higher than any other astronomical instrument, capable of imaging the sky with a level of detail measured in microarcseconds. VLBI generally benefits from the longer baselines afforded by international collaboration, with a notable early example in 1976, when radio telescopes in the United States, USSR and Australia were linked to observe hydroxyl-maser sources. This technique is currently being used by the Event Horizon Telescope, whose goal is to observe the supermassive black holes at the centers of the Milky Way Galaxy and Messier 87.

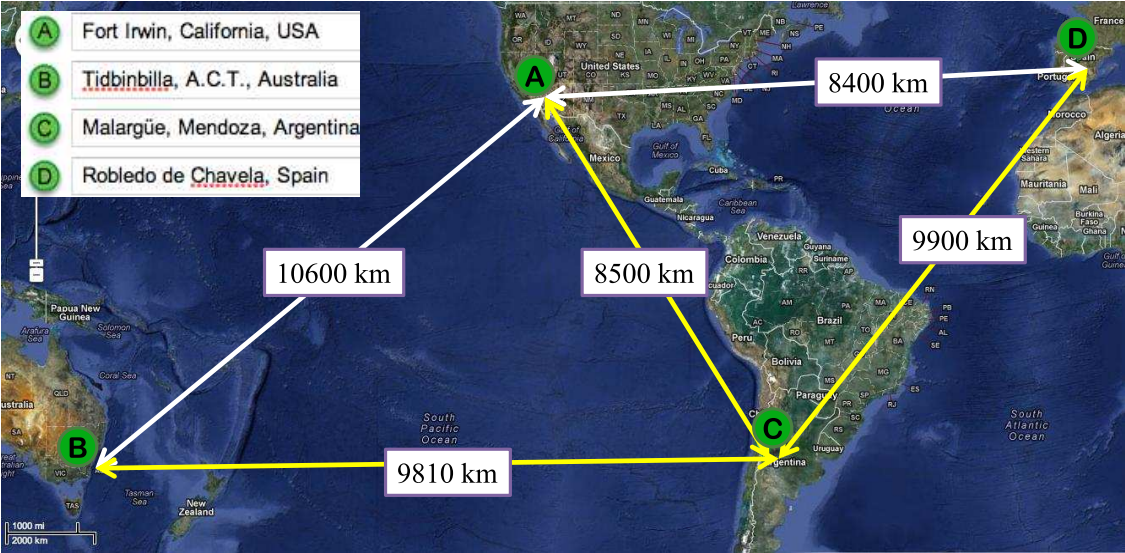
Distance to Malargue station from the other stations of the NASA VLBI network

NASAs Deep Space Network uses its larger antennas (normally used for spacecraft communication) for VLBI, in order to construct radio reference frames for the purpose of spacecraft navigation. The inclusion of the ESA station at Malargue, Argentina, adds baselines that allow much better coverage of the southern hemisphere.

== e-VLBI ==
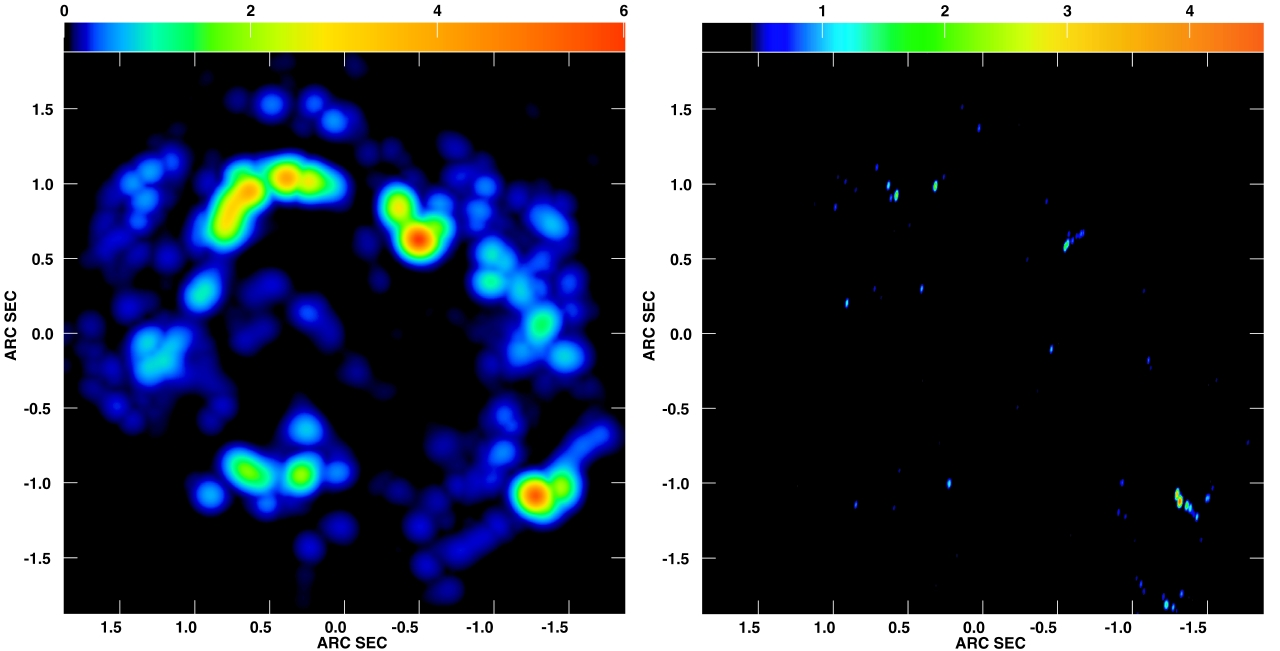
Image of the source IRC +10420. The lower resolution image on the left was taken with the UK's MERLIN array and shows the shell of maser emission produced by an expanding shell of gas with a diameter about 200 times that of the Solar System. The shell of gas was ejected from a supergiant star (10 times the mass of the Sun) at the centre of the emission about 900 years ago. The corresponding EVN e-VLBI image (right) shows the much finer structure of the masers made visible with the higher resolution of the VLBI array.

VLBI has traditionally operated by recording the signal at each telescope on magnetic tapes or disks, and shipping those to the correlation center for replay. In 2004 it became possible to connect VLBI radio telescopes in close to real-time, while still employing the local time references of the VLBI technique, in a technique known as e-VLBI. In Europe, six radio telescopes of the European VLBI Network (EVN) were connected with Gigabit per second links via their National Research Networks and the Pan-European research network GEANT2, and the first astronomical experiments using this new technique were successfully conducted.

The image to the right shows the first science produced by the European VLBI Network using e-VLBI. The data from each of the telescopes were routed through the GÉANT2 network and on through SURFnet to be the processed in real time at the European Data Processing centre at JIVE.

== Space VLBI ==
In the quest for even greater angular resolution, dedicated VLBI satellites have been placed in Earth orbit to provide greatly extended baselines. Experiments incorporating such space-borne array elements are termed Space Very Long Baseline Interferometry (SVLBI). The first SVLBI experiment was carried out on Salyut-6 orbital station with KRT-10, a 10-meter radio telescope, which was launched in July 1978.

The first dedicated SVLBI satellite was HALCA, an 8-meter radio telescope, which was launched in February 1997 and made observations until October 2003. Due to the small size of the dish, only very strong radio sources could be observed with SVLBI arrays incorporating it.

Another SVLBI satellite, a 10-meter radio telescope Spektr-R, was launched in July 2011 and made observations until January 2019. It was placed into a highly elliptical orbit, ranging from a perigee of 10,652 km to an apogee of 338,541 km, making RadioAstron, the SVLBI program incorporating the satellite and ground arrays, the biggest radio interferometer to date. The resolution of the system reached 8 microarcseconds.

== International VLBI Service for Geodesy and Astrometry ==
The International VLBI Service for Geodesy and Astrometry (IVS) is an international collaboration whose purpose is to use the observation of astronomical radio sources using VLBI to precisely determine earth orientation parameters (EOP) and celestial reference frames (CRF) and terrestrial reference frames (TRF). IVS is a service operating under the International Astronomical Union (IAU) and the International Association of Geodesy (IAG).
