= National Geographic Institute =

National Geographic Institute may refer to:

- National Geographic Institute (Belgium)
- National Geographic Institute (France)
- National Geographic Institute (Guatemala)
- National Geographic Institute (Peru)
- National Geographic Institute (Spain)

== See also ==
- National mapping agency, including a list of agencies
- IGN (disambiguation)
