= Igns =

Igns or IGNS, may refer to:

- Institute of Geological and Nuclear Sciences, a New Zealand Crown Research Institute
- NASU Institute of Environment Geochemistry (igns.gov.ua; Ukrainian: Інститут геохімії навколишнього середовища НАН України, romanized: Instytut heokhimiyi navkolyshnʹoho seredovyshcha NAN Ukrayiny; abbreviated: Ukrainian: Ігнс, romanized: Igns, lit. 'IHNS'), Kyiv, Ukraine
- Inspector General Nuclear Safety, a senior appointment of the Indian Navy
- Igns Dedura (born 1978), Latvian soccer player
- Ignatius (abbreviated: Igns.), a male given name
  - Chrn. Igns. LaTrobe, abbreviation for Christian Ignatius Latrobe (1758–1836), British clergyman who collected and compiled religious music

== See also ==
- International Global Navigation Satellite Systems Association (IGNSS) for satellite navigation
- IGN (disambiguation), for the singular of IGNs
