= IGN (disambiguation) =

IGN, formerly Imagine Games Network, is an American video game and entertainment media website.

IGN or ign may also refer to:

== National institutes ==
- Institut géographique national, the French national geographic institute, now called Institut national de l'information géographique et forestière
- Instituto Geográfico Nacional (Guatemala), the Guatemalan national geographic institute
- National Geographic Institute (Peru), the Peruvian national geographic institute
- Instituto Geográfico Nacional (Spain), the Spanish national geographic institute
- Nationaal Geografisch Instituut - Institut Géographique National, the Belgian national geographic institute (often referred to by the abbreviations "IGN" in Walloon and "NGI" in Flemish)

== Other uses ==
- IGN, an abbreviation for an in-game name
- Imperial German Navy, the navy for the German Empire from 1871 to 1919
- Intergovernmental Negotiations framework, a process to reform the United Nations Security Council
- International-Great Northern Railroad (I&GN), a railroad in the U.S. state of Texas
- Iodine Global Network, a nonprofit organization
- Ignaciano language (ISO 639-3 code: ign)
- Maria Cristina Airport, Philippines (IATA code: IGN)

== See also ==
- IGE, or Internet Gaming Entertainment, an MMORPG services company
