= L69 =

L69 may refer to:

- Albatros L 69, a 1920s German two-seat trainer aircraft
- HMS L69, a 1917 British L class submarine
- HMS Tanatside (L69), a 1942 British Hunt class destroyer
- a type of Chevrolet Small-Block engine
- L69 Group, group of countries supporting United Nations Reforms

ℓ 69 may refer to:

- Lectionary 69, a 12th-century Greek manuscript of the New Testament on vellum leaves
