= Yebes Observatory RT40m =

Radio telescope at Yebes, Spain

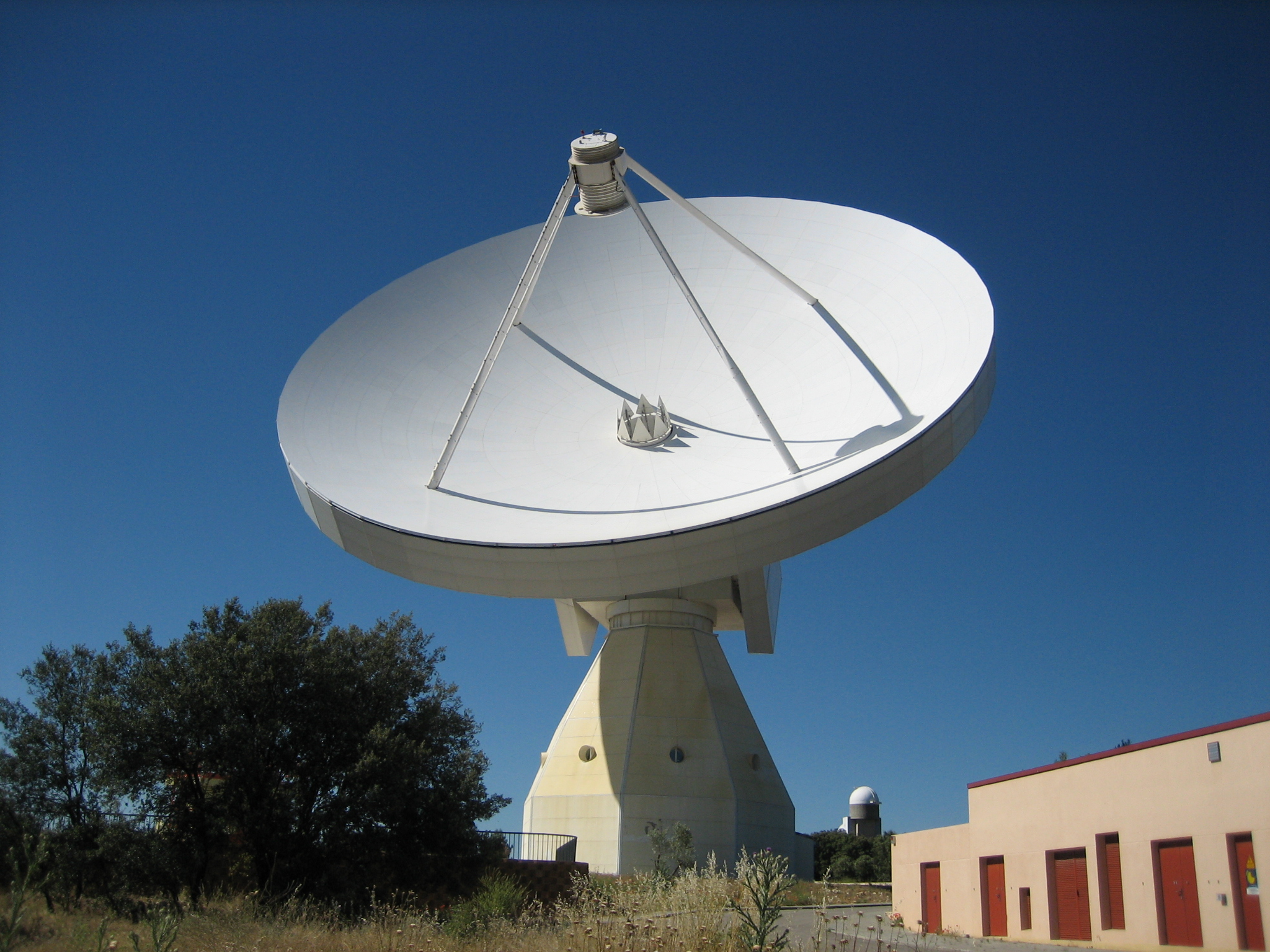
- Location: Yebes, Province of Guadalajara, Castilla–La Mancha, Spain
- Coordinates: 40°31′31″N 3°05′19″W
- Altitude: 931 m (3,054 ft)
- Diameter: 40 m (131 ft 3 in)
- Collecting area: 1,250 m^{2} (13,500 sq ft)
- Website: astronomia.ign.es
- Location within Spain
- Related media on Commons

The Yebes Observatory RT40m, or ARIESXXI, is a radio telescope which is part of the observatory at Yebes, Spain. It is a 40-metre Cassegrain–Nasmyth telescope. It is the largest observing instrument at Yebes Observatory.

The telescope is publicly owned by the Spanish government’s Ministry of Transport and Sustainable Mobility. The Observatory is open competitively to astronomers and external observers worldwide under an open-sky policy.

The telescope’s observing frequencies range from 2 to 90 GHz, and it operates both in single-dish mode and as part of Very-long-Baseline Interferometry (VLBI) networks. The telescope has multiple observing modes including positron switching, frequency switching, and mapping in Q (31.5-50.6 GHz) and W (72–90 GHz) frequency bands, a feature that is unique for telescopes of its kind.

== Location ==
The telescope is located at Yebes Observatory (Spanish: Centro Astronómico de Yebes (CAY)). Yebes Observatory is the main scientific and technical facility of the National Geographic Institute of Spain.

The observatory is located around 50 kilometres (31 miles) to the North-East of Madrid in the province of Guadalajara in the autonomous community of Castilla-La Mancha. It is located at an altitude of 931 meters above sea level and benefits from exceptional observing conditions throughout the year. The precipitable water vapor (PWV) level remains below 6 mm, dropping to a minimum of 2 mm during winter. The wind velocity is generally below 5 m/s for most of the year, and the occurrence of rainy or snowy days is less than one week annually.

The Technological Development Centre (CDT) facilities include two radio telescopes, a solar tower, an astrograph and a Gravimeter. The most powerful telescope is the newly constructed 40 m telescope which was completed in 2005 and saw first light in ¿May 2007?. ARIESXXI was specifically designed to be integrated in the European Very Long Baseline Interferometry network (EVN) as well as operating as a single dish. It currently has active receivers in S-Band (2.2–2.37 GHz), CH-Band (3.22–3.39 GHz), C band which is split in two sub-bands (4.56–5.06 GHz and 5.9–6.9 GHz), X-band (8.15–9.00 GHz) and K-Band (split in four bands between 21.77 and 24.45 GHz). A 100 GHz receiver is currently being installed for millimetre wave VLBI. The CDT has advanced receiver laboratories on site (low-noise amplifiers, quasi-optics etc.) that allows the dedicated team of more than 20 engineers and astronomers present to develop and optimize new and existing receivers. The R&D undertaken in the CDT under the mandate of the OAN permits it to share information and resources with the other important radio observatory in Spain, the IRAM radio telescope at Pico Veleta in Granada. This collaboration also permits the free exchange of ideas and personnel with IRAM's facilities in France and Spain and facilitates technology exchanges between sister institutes in other European countries which participate in the EVN.

== History ==
The project "A Radio Telescope for Spain" was conceived from a series of National Development Plans for Radio Astronomy undertaken in the mid and late 90s. These plans culminated in a technical meeting in Madrid in the late 90s where the CAY personnel in conjunction with experts from all over Europe carried out an exhaustive study to define the characteristics required by such a telescope in order to participate actively in the international astronomy community. Once the appropriate homology and applications of the telescope had been selected a feasibility study was carried out with the fundamental objective of determining whether or not it was practical to construct such a telescope in Spain and if so how to maximize the participation of Spanish industry in said project. This study was undertaken by INISEL Espacio and finally the contract for the detailed design and construction was awarded to a German company with a long experience of design and maintenance of radio telescope and radar dishes, MAN Technologie. Thus the initial construction work began in 2000 with the pouring of foundations and the placement of the concrete pedestal, built by ACS, that would support the telescope reflectors and associated support structure. The same year saw the production of the azimuth and elevation bearings by Rothe-Erde and FAQ of Germany respectively. 2000 also saw the construction of the steel back-support structure for the telescope by Schwartz-Hautmont Construcciones Metálicas of Spain. The contract for the design of the focal plane optics was awarded to ESTI of the Technical University of Telecommunications in Madrid to couple the Cassegrain focal plane radiation to the receivers. In 2001 the contract for the manufacturing of the surface panels of the primary and secondary reflectors was awarded to Schwartz-Hautmont and then installation of the servo-motors to BBH of Germany. Finally in 2003 the electrical installation was completed by ELIMCO of Spain.

Commissioning began in ¿2005? and finished in 2007.

== Telescope properties ==
Parameter	Value
Optics	Nasmyth-Cassegrain
Monunt	Alt-Azimuth
Focal Planes	Primary and Masmyth
F/D	7.9
Aperture Efficiency	70%@7mm,50%@3mm
Pointing Accuracy	3.7" in winds of 10 m/s
Surface Accuracy	150 um
Weight	400 metric tons

The values of the most important optical parameters of the telescope
Parameter	Value
Dm	40m
Ds	3.28m
Lv	1.204m
Lr	25.396m
Fm/Dm	0.375
Fm	15m
Feq	316.6
Feq/Dm	7.9
Mag	21.09
Fc	26.6m
g	11.6m
g'	6.6m
hp	6.667m
hs	7.129m
Theta	3.621°

The ARIESXXI radio telescope is an alt-azimuthal design with a rotating head above an azimuthal bearing or turning head. It has full 360-degree movement in azimuth and horizon to horizon coverage in elevation (180 degrees total or slightly less?). As previously mentioned the telescope is Nasmyth-Cassegrain model that consists of a parabolic primary reflector and a hyperbolic secondary reflector that brings the dual system to a focus some 11 metres below, within the structure of the telescope housing, via a beam-guide. The optical configuration of the tertiary Nasmyth system is such that the focus is always maintained in the same place as the flat Nasmyth mirrors track the movement of the principal axis of the dual reflector to ensure a constant illumination of the receivers. This allows the receiver antennas to remain fixed in position and greatly simplifies the opto-mechanical design of the receiver suite.

The sub-reflector can be displaced axially through focus to aid in correcting defocusing effects during telescope slewing caused by gravitational/elevation deformations. It is a hollow structure that permits the mounting of a holographic receptor within which will be used for determining the surface accuracy of the primary reflector panels. The telescope design follows the principle of homology. It can operate in winds up to 15 m/s and a maximum wind speed of up to 50 m/s can be withstood without structural damage being sustained. The surface accuracy can reach at least 150 microns RMS with a maximum accuracy of 75 microns RMS achievable. In order to attain this level of planarity each individual panel must fulfill a surface accuracy of 60 microns. A minimum planarity of 150 microns allows operation up to 125 GHz applying the Ruze condition of λ/16 with an upper threshold frequency of 250 GHz in the case of 75 microns accuracy. The measured inefficiencies of ARIESXXI are ?% at ? GHz which compare to a theoretical maximum of 78% for a blocked Gaussian illumination and with a constant edge taper of −10.9 dB at the sub-reflector.

=== Optics ===
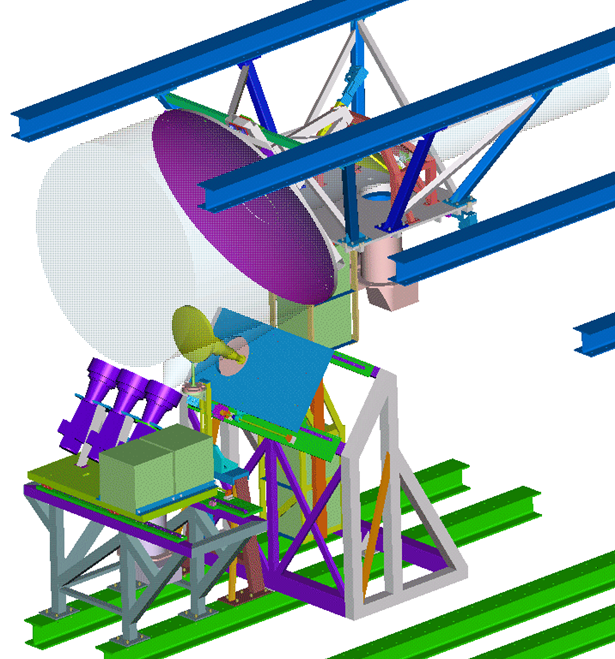
Tertiary optics.

The optical system consists of three main components:

The Primary Reflector

M1 is a 40 metre main parabolic reflector made up of 420 aluminium panels organized in 10 concentric rings. Each panel is fabricated from an aluminium plate approximately 1.8 mm thick and is covered with an epoxy to protect against the elements. The panels are mounted on a re-enforced aluminium skeleton and each panel is associated with a mechanical actuator that allows precision movements and orientation of each panel to 14 microns. The primary focus is located 15 metres from the parabolas vertex and is coincident with one of the foci of the secondary. The entire primary reflector and support structure weighs 200 tons.

The Secondary Reflector

M2 is the hyperbolic sub-reflector of the dual reflector Cassegrain system and has a diameter of 3.28 metres. It is made from a carbon fibre shell covered in a thin layer of aluminium foil. The requirement on the surface flatness is tighter than for the primary due to the scaling of the main beam size and comes in at 53 microns RMS. It has two nominal movement phase; firstly a fine motion to correct for defocusing as a small defocus at the secondary is magnified 21 times at the Cassegrain focus and which can result in large coupling losses especially at high frequencies. Secondly a large axial displacement is also possible (1 metre) which allows the holographic receptor to be placed in the focus of the parabolic reflector.

Nasmyth Mirrors

M3 and M4/M4' are the Nasmyth mirrors which redirect the incoming beam from the sky to the Nasmyth focus which is in essence the Cassegrain focus but displaced. Both mirror are flat and have a diameter of 2.65 metres and form a 45 degree angle with the optical axis of the telescope. The primary function of these mirrors is to ensure a continuous illumination of the tertiary optical system. Currently only the M4 branch is furnished with receivers with M4' reserved for future high frequency and/or multi-beam receivers

Tertiary Optics

The tertiary optics are responsible for the efficient coupling of the sky to the horn antennas of the 5 frequency bands of ARIESXXI. The first element encountered is an offset-parabolic with a focal length of 1.36 metres which converts the incoming quasi-plane wave to a converging beam which is then incident on a shaped dichroic lens that passes S/C/CH frequency for coupling to their respective feeds and reflects the X-band radiation towards the X-band feed.

=== Receivers ===
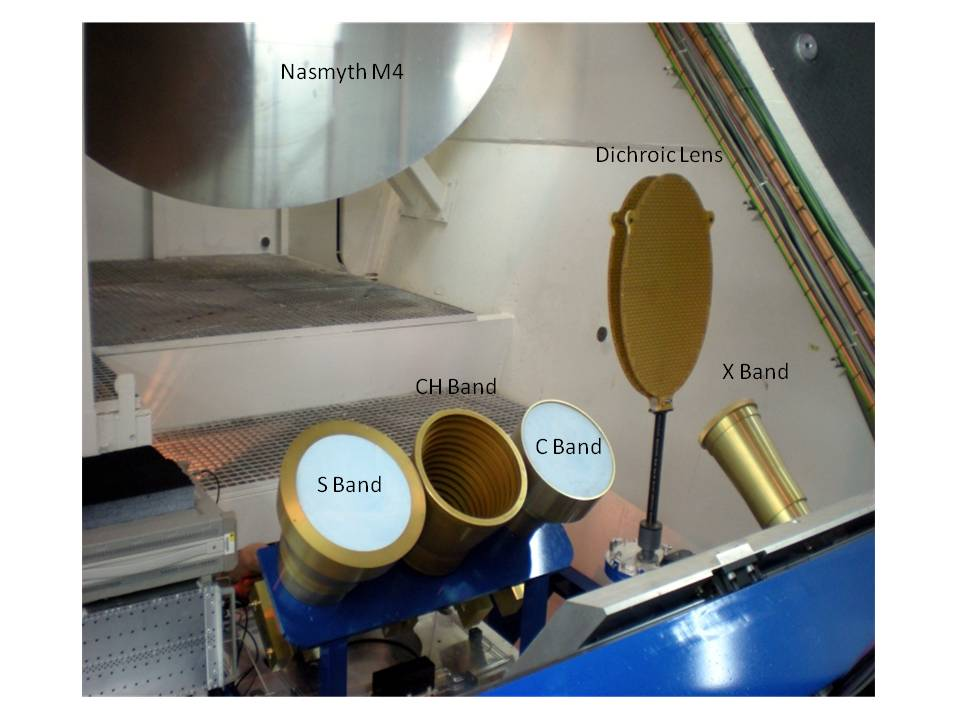
The S/CH/C band receivers.

ARIESXXI boasts an unusually large receiver cabin (8 × 9 x 3.5 metres) which permits the housing of a large number of receivers. The cabin currently houses six receivers all of which reside in one of the two optical branches available (M and M'). The orientation of the Nasmyth mirrors can also be altered to 0° and 20° if required to include additional optical paths and which substantially increases the number of receptors which can potentially be placed in the cabin. The receiver currently installed are as follows :

S-Band

The S-Band is a dual polarization band with observable frequencies between 2.2 and 2.37 GHz. The S-Band receiver consists of a choke ring axial corrugated horn designed by the Antenna Group at the Technical University of Madrid. The horn antenna is coupled to a waveguide to coaxial polariser that separates out the two orthogonal components of the incoming circularly polarised beam. The two linear polarisations are then fed directly to two low noise cryogenically cooled amplifiers. Following 2nd stage amplification, conditioning and filtering the astronomical signal is mixed with a Local Oscillator signal at 1.53 GHz to give a 170 MHz Intermediate Frequency (IF) bandwidth centred at 755 GHz. This IF is then re-routed to the backends in the control room some 5 metres below via a cable wrap. A phasecal signal is also injected to the IF module to remove phase errors. This band is primarily used for atmospheric calibration of VLBI observations?¿.

CH-Band

The C-H band is a dual polarisation channel that covers from 3.22 – 3.39 GHzThe receiver consists of a choke ring axial corrugated horn that was designed by the Antenna Group at the Technical University of Madrid. The horn antenna is coupled to a waveguide to coaxial polariser that separates out the two orthogonal components of the incoming circularly polarised beam. The two linear polarisations are then fed directly to two low noise cryogenically cooled amplifiers. Following 2nd stage amplification, conditioning and filtering the astronomical signal is mixed with a Local Oscillator signal at 2.555 GHz to give a 170 MHz IF bandwidth centred at 750 MHz. This IF is then re-routed to the backends in the control room some 5 metres below via a cable wrap. A phasecal signal is also injected to the IF module to remove phase errors. This band is important for observing the three Ch molecular lines which are considered extremely important in understanding the chemistry of the interstellar medium.

C-Band

The C-Band has three dual polarization sub-bands that are not simultaneously observable from 4.56 – 5.06 GHz, 5.9 – 6.4 GHz and 6.4 – 6.9 GHz. The C-Band receiver also consists of a choke ring axial corrugated horn and was designed by the Antenna Group at the University of Navarra. The horn antenna is then coupled to a waveguide to coaxial polariser that separates out the two orthogonal components of the incoming circularly polarised beam. The two linear polarisations are then fed directly to two low noise cryogenically cooled amplifiers. Following 2nd stage amplification, conditioning and filtering the astronomical signal is mixed with a Local Oscillator signal to give a 200 MHz or 500 MHz IF bandwidth centred at 750 and 800 MHz respectively. This IF is then re-routed to the backends in the control room some 5 metres below via a cable wrap. A phasecal signal can also be injected to the IF module to remove phase errors. This band is particularly important for the observation of formaldehyde (H_{2}CO) and methanol (CH_{3}OH) whose interstellar distributions can yield important information about the structure of the galaxy.

X-Band

The X-Band has two simultaneously observable dual polarization sub-bands from 8.18 – 8.65 GHz called the Standard band and from 8.65 – 8.98 GHz called the expanded band. The X-Band receiver consists of a smooth walled conical horn and was designed by the Antenna Group at the Technical University of Madrid. The horn antenna is then coupled to a waveguide to coaxial polariser that separates out the two orthogonal components of the incoming circularly polarised beam. The two linear polarisations are then fed directly to two low noise cryogenically cooled amplifiers. Following 2nd stage amplification, conditioning and filtering the astronomical signal is mixed with a Local Oscillator signal to give a 500 MHz IF in the standard band and a 330 MHz IF bandwidth in the expanded band. This IF is then re-routed to the backends in the control room some 5 metres below via a cable wrap. A phasecal signal can also be injected to the IF module to remove phase errors.

K-Band

Dual polarization (LCP & RCP) receiver of the 18-26 GHz band.

Q-Band

Dual polarization (LCP & RCP) receiver of the 41-49 GHz band.

W-Band

Single polarization (RCP) receiver of the 78-110 GHz band.

=== Back ends ===
ARIESXXI utilizes the MarkV correlator backend system based on solid-state storage (as opposed to the MarkIV system which used magnetic tapes.

== Science ==
The telescope observes both as a stand-alone telescope, and as part of VLBI networks. Up to 30% of its observing time is available to astronomers on a global basis.

=== VLBI ===
Since 2008, the telescope has been used for Very-long-baseline interferometry for both astronomy and geodesy. It is part of the European VLBI Network, the Global mm VLBI Array, and the International VLBI Service for Geodesy and Astrometry.

=== Single Dish Observations ===
The telescope is also used to observe spectral lines from interstellar molecules in circumstellar envelopes, the interstellar medium within the Galaxy, and extragalactic sources.
