= Las Palmas Air Base =

Airport in Peru

Las Palmas air base Base Aérea Las Palmas
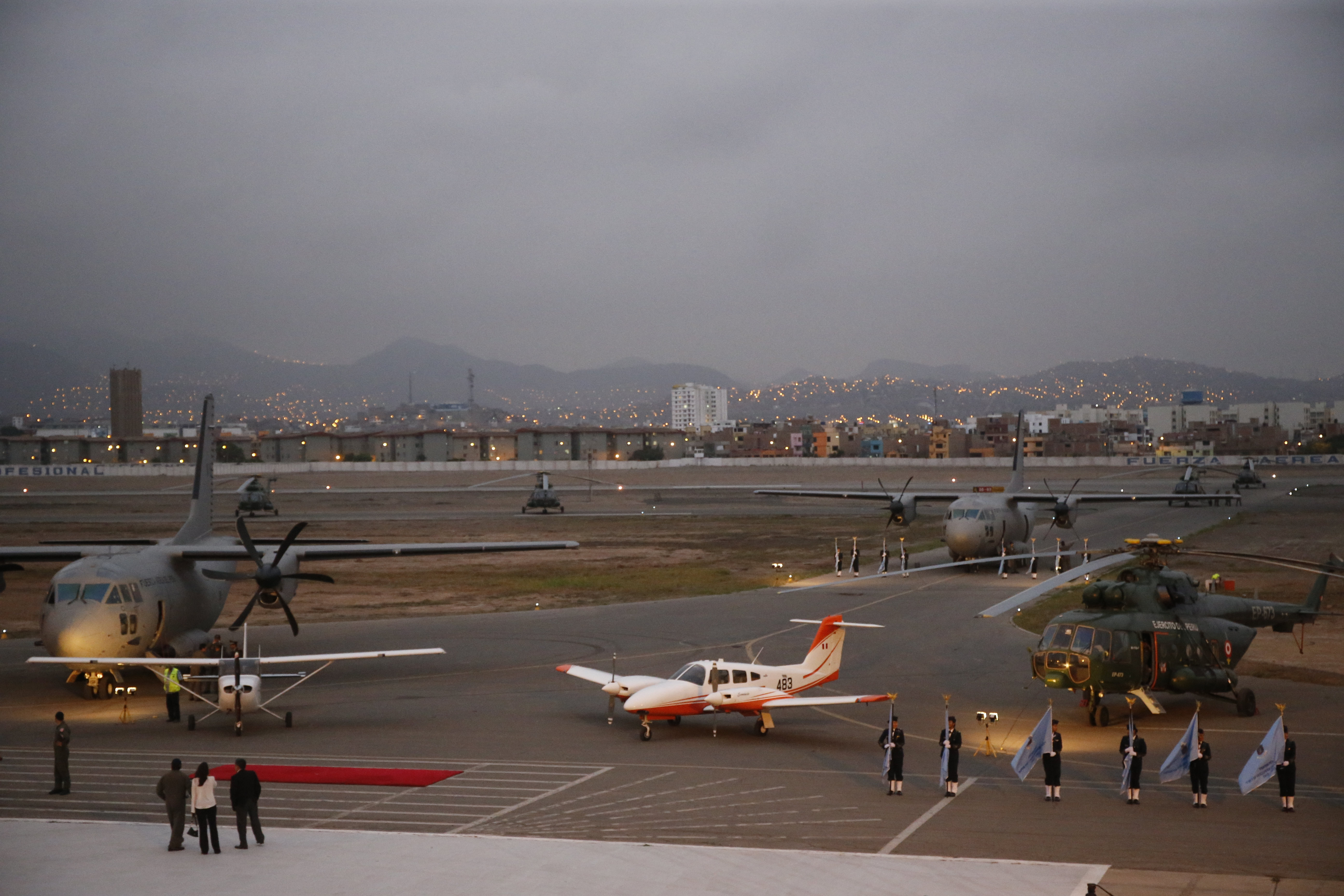
- IATA: none; ICAO: SPLP

Summary
- Airport type: Public
- Owner: Fuerza Aerea del Perú; United States Air Force
- Operator: 2ª Región aérea territorial FAP
- Location: Lima
- Elevation AMSL: 243 ft / 74 m
- Coordinates: 12°09′35″S 77°00′00″W

Map
- Location of the airport in Peru

Runways
Direction	Length		Surface
Direction	m	ft	Surface
02/20	2,285	7,497	Asphalt
- Sources: GCM Google Maps

Las Palmas Air Base is a military airport in Santiago de Surco District, city of Lima, Peru. It is administered by the Peruvian Air Force (abbreviated FAP), one of three branches of the Peruvian Armed Forces. The United States Air Force began operations there on June 1, 2023.

The runway length does not include a 150 metres (490 ft) displaced threshold on Runway 02. The Lima VOR-DME (Ident: LIM) is 11.7 nautical miles (21.7 km) northwest of the runway.

== History ==
During the Japanese embassy hostage crisis, a replica of the ambassador's residence was built on the base's premises, where a rescue operation was practiced until its execution in 1997.

The National Aerophotographic Service is housed in its premises.

=== 2019 Pan American Games ===
The air base was the stage for the shooting competitions at the 2019 Pan American Games.

== See also ==
- Transport in Peru
- List of airports in Peru
- Venues of the 2019 Pan American and Parapan American Games
