= Intergovernmental Negotiations framework =

The Intergovernmental Negotiations framework or IGN is a group of nation-states working within the United Nations to further reform of the United Nations Security Council (UNSC).

== Composition ==
The IGN is composed of several different international organizations, namely:

- The African Union;
- The G4 nations;
- The Uniting for Consensus Group (UfC), also known as the "Coffee Club";
- The L.69 Group of Developing Countries;
- The Arab League; and
- The Caribbean Community (CARICOM).

Each group represents a different set of positions vis-a-vis reforming the United Nations Security Council. On July 27, 2016, an "oral decision" was adopted by the United Nations General Assembly by general acclamation of its members, which approved of a declaration known as the "elements of convergence" which outlined the status of the consensus reached by the members of the IGN at that time. This statement of consensus was based on a text and annex, of a year earlier. Ultimately, by adopting the "elements of consensus" document, the General Assembly decided to form an "Open Ended Working Group" to further develop a consensus position of the entire General Assembly on the issue of reforming the U.N. Security Council. This program had its origins in 1993, with successive reports in 2001 and 2007. The current agenda for this issue in the U.N. General Assembly can be found online.

== Positions of each group ==
The positions of the various groups of nations composing the IGN framework can be summarized as follows:

=== The African Union ===
"While the group was pleased that the consensus decision would roll over the issue into the next session, the AU remained committed to a text-based reform process. In particular, the AU called attention to a letter circulated by the group on 21 July 2016, in response to the elements of convergence on working methods and the size of a reformed Council. As the AU pointed out, the “elements” reflect only two out of five of the issues discussed in the IGN process. As such, it does not adequately reflect the record of the IGN in the 70th session, as there was substantial agreement and discussion of the other three issues which was not represented in the elements of convergence text. The AU called for a democratic, transparent, and accountable process, and for text-based negotiations to make the UN ‘fit for purpose'."

=== The G4 nations ===
Brazil, in its capacity as representative of the G4, called for the start of text-based negotiations to give the IGN substantive meaning. The G4 appreciated the elements of conversion text, which served to identify trends and move towards consensus, even if the text does not reflect all G4 positions. However, the Group was disappointed that there was not convergence on the other three issues. The G4 noted that they had hoped to begin concrete negotiations during the 70th session, arguing that the longer Security Council reform is postponed, the greater the discredit to the UN. The status quo is no longer an option, and there is a recognized need for a strong multilateral system. Brazil cited the major agreements reached over the last years—the 2030 Agenda for Sustainable Development and the Paris Climate Agreement, among others, but noted that the realm of peace and security is noticeably lacking in progress and reform. Brazil concluded its statement with a reminder of the need for a ‘UN fit for purpose on peace and security, in a discrete timeframe.’

=== The Uniting for Consensus Group (UfC), also known as the "Coffee Club" ===
"Italy, speaking for the United for Consensus group (UfC)[,] . . . applauded the technical rollover, which paved the way for continued discussion aiming for a broad consensus. It noted that the IGN is a member-driven process, that all sessions and meetings have been important for movement towards consensus, and that the points of convergence submitted by the facilitator reflect UfC’s understanding of the areas of convergence. UfC further called for flexibility and compromise on the remaining issues, in order to lead to a broad consensus decision in the future."

=== The L.69 Group of Developing Countries ===
"Nicaragua . . ., representing the L69 group of developing countries[, said they were] . . . pleased that the framework and annexes, submitted in 2015, would remain central to the IGN’s work moving forward. The L69 argued that text-based negotiations would be vital, and should be conducted on the basis of the framework text, especially on the other three key issues for reform. In closing, the group hoped that the 71st session would lead to more concrete progress."

=== The Arab League ===
"Kuwait, representing the Arab States, reaffirmed the desire for a broad decision and for continuing IGN debates in the 71st session. The group hoped for consensus, in order to lead to true and comprehensive reform."

=== The Caribbean Community (CARICOM) ===
"Guyana, speaking for the Caribbean Community (CARICOM), welcomed the rollover, and called for further work and reflection on Member State proposals when considering the achievements of the IGN in the 70th session, as well as the framework and annexes. CARICOM called the progress made important, though limited, and hoped that the text and elements of convergence would be a foundation for reform work in the 71st session."

=== Russia and China (UNSC Permanent Members) ===
"China welcomed the rollover, and called for the next session to uphold the leadership of the UN and Member States, and reflect all the views of participants. Russia welcomed the rollover as well, noting that consensus adoption was good, but that there was far from universal agreement in the negotiations. Russia asked that reforms be adopted with more than a two-thirds majority, though ideally through consensus, and ended with a call for a transparent and inclusive process without artificially imposed timelines."
