= Yebes =

Yebes, Spain
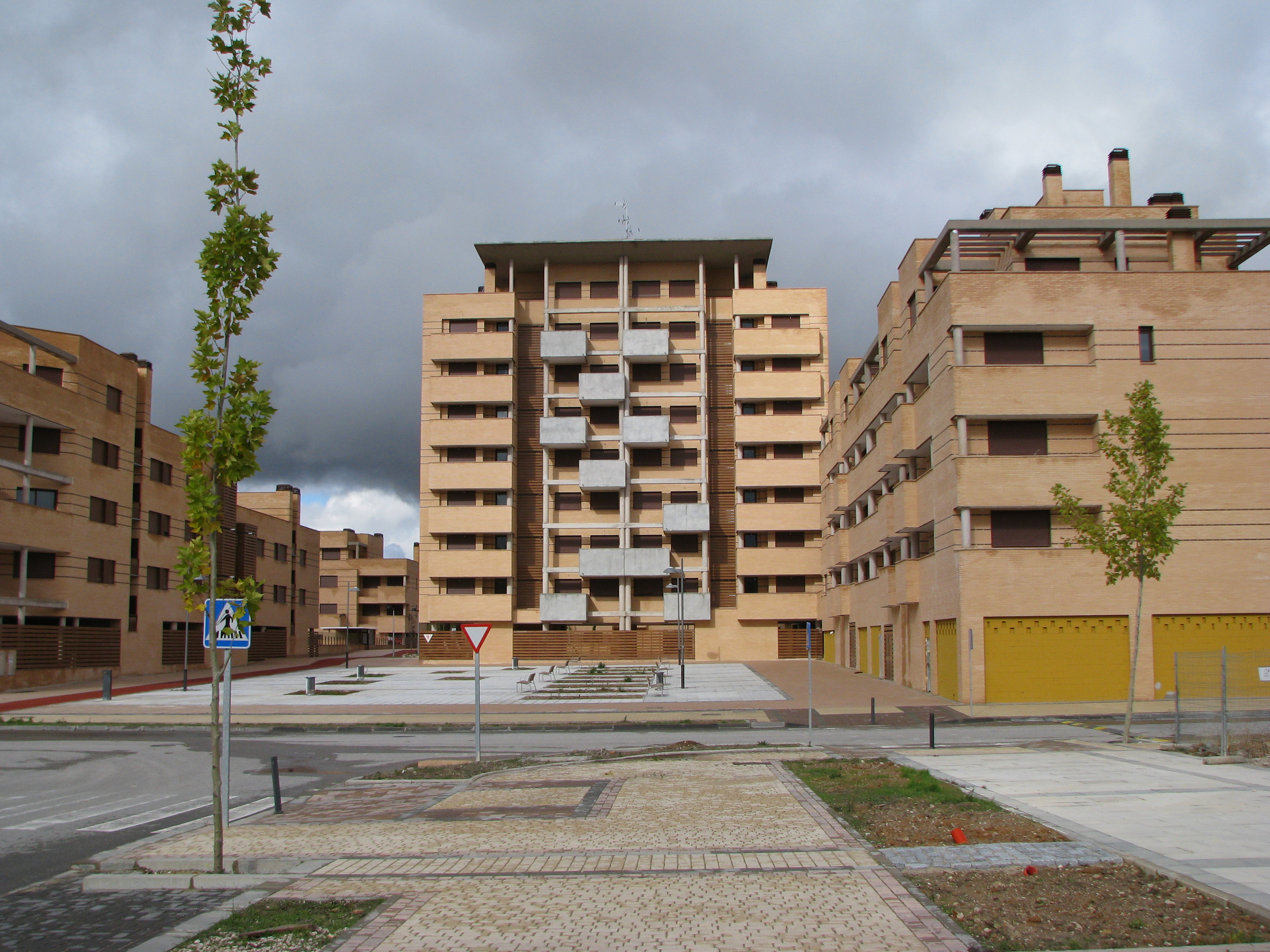

- Coat of arms

- Location within Province of Guadalajara Location within Castilla-La Mancha Location within Spain
- Coordinates: 40°32′05″N 3°06′35″W
- Country: Spain
- Autonomous community: Castilla–La Mancha
- Province: Guadalajara
- Municipality: Yebes

Area
  - Total: 17 km^{2} (6.6 sq mi)

Population (2025-01-01)
  - Total: 5,637
  - Density: 330/km^{2} (860/sq mi)
- Time zone: UTC+1 (CET)
  - Summer (DST): UTC+2 (CEST)

Yebes is a municipality located in the province of Guadalajara, Castilla–La Mancha, Spain. According to the 2004 census (INE), the municipality had a population of 235 inhabitants.

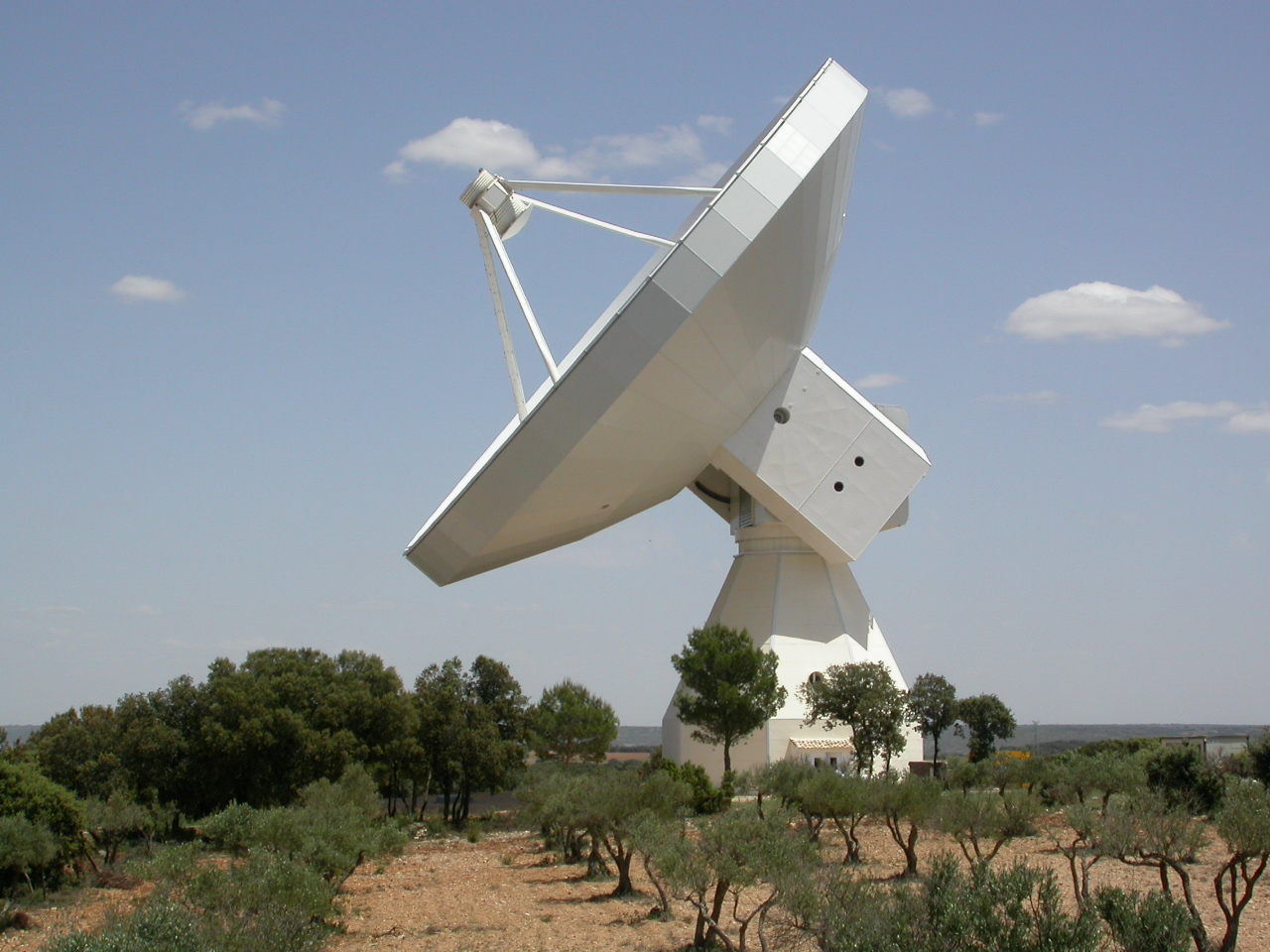
Yebes radio telescope

The Yebes Observatory with its RT40m radio telescope is located in Yebes.

== Ciudad Valdeluz ==
The construction of a new town within the boundaries of Yebes was approved in September 2002 by the provincial planning commission. The project called Ciudad Valdeluz was intended to take advantage of the new high-speed railway between Madrid and Barcelona. Construction began in 2004, and the first residents arrived in 2006. Before completion of the project it was adversely affected by the Spanish property bubble, which made the properties difficult to sell. The developer Construcciones Reyal S.A. had invested more than 1.1 billion of Euros before the economic bubble exploded. By 2024 the population had reached 5,400. This was less than originally planned.

== See also ==
- Guadalajara–Yebes railway station
