= Yebes Observatory =

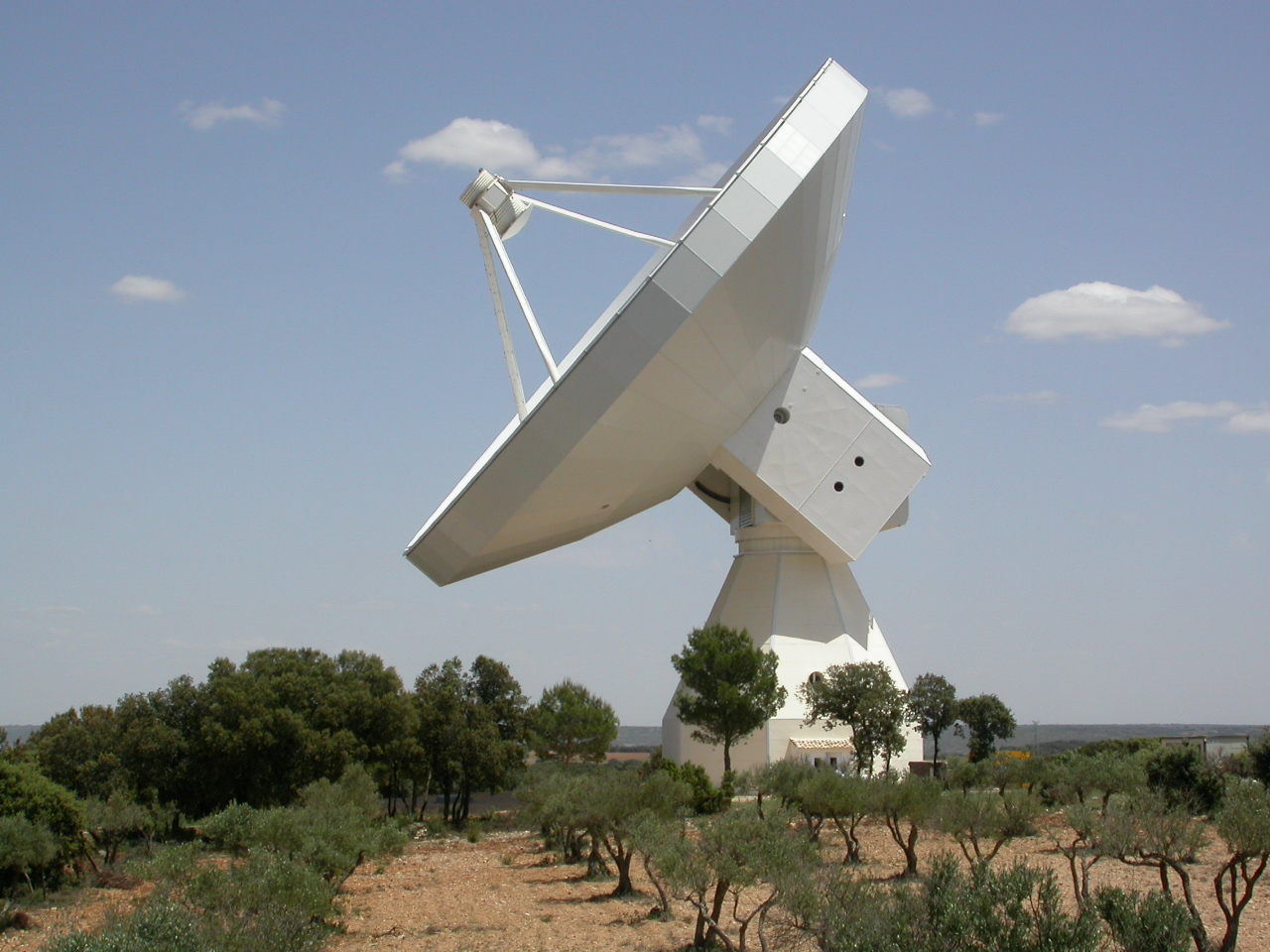
- The 40m Yebes radio telescope
- Observatory code: 491
- Location: 4661 Yebes
- Coordinates: 40°31′31″N 3°05′19″W
- Telescopes: Yebes 14m radio telescope; Yebes Observatory RT40m
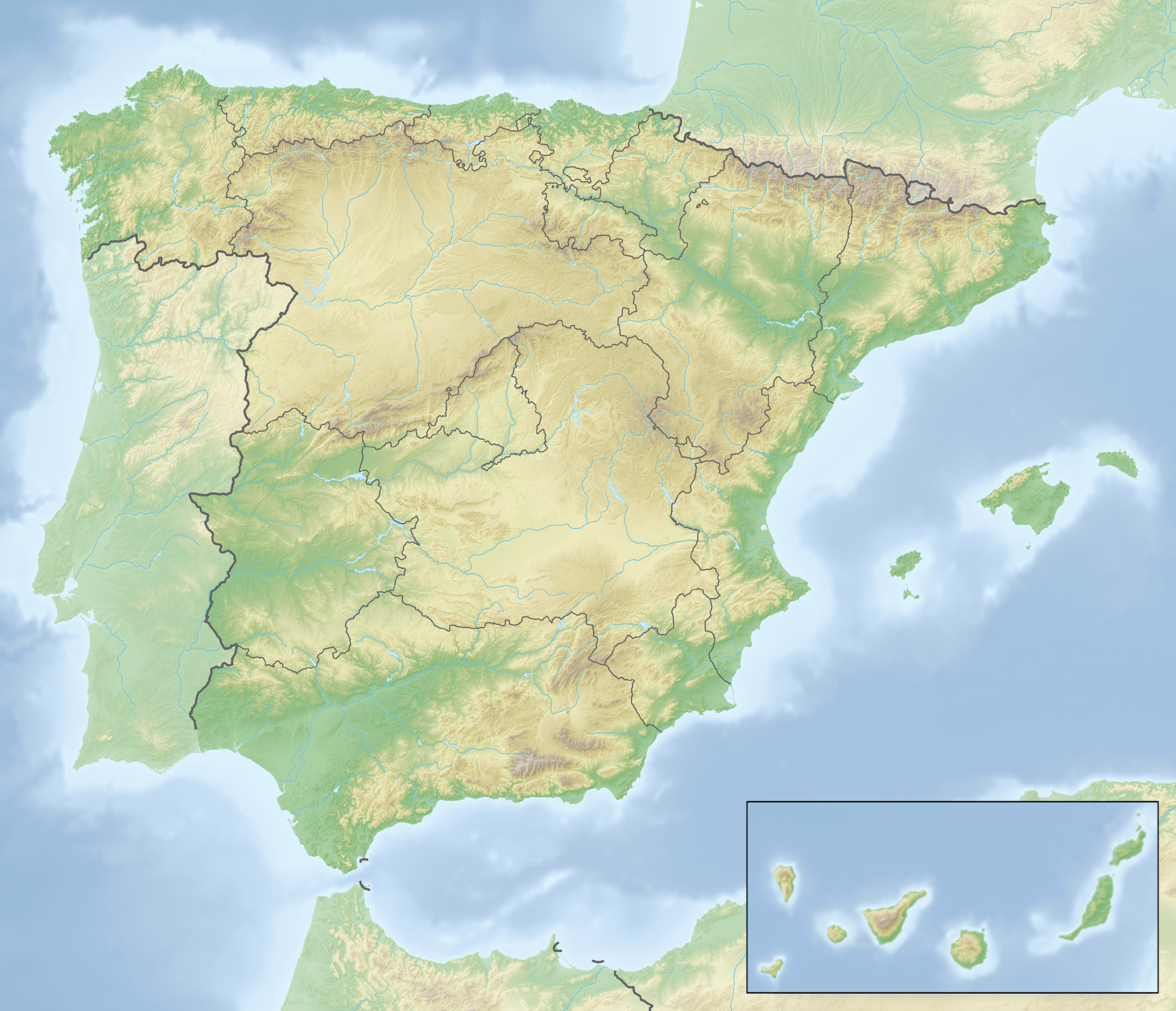
- Location of Yebes Observatory
- Related media on Commons

Yebes Observatory (Spanish: Centro Astronómico de Yebes (CAY)) is an astronomical observatory located at Yebes, Castilla-La Mancha, Spain.

Yebes Observatory is the main scientific and technical facility of the National Geographic Institute of Spain.

The facilities include two radio telescopes, a solar tower, an astrograph and a Gravimeter. The most powerful telescope is the RT40 m telescope.
