= National Aerophotographic Service =

Aerial photography agency in Peru

- Servicio Aerofotográfico Nacional
- Abbreviation: SAN, SANDIVRA
- Formation: 1942
- Headquarters: Las Palmas Air Base

The National Aerophotographic Service (Spanish: Servicio Aerofotográfico Nacional; SAN / SANDIVRA) is an aerial photography service of the Peruvian Air Force, it is part of its Directorate of Surveillance and Aerial Reconnaissance. It is located within Las Palmas Air Base.

== History ==
It was created in 1942, being the first aerial photography project in the country: Lima 100, equipped with the most advanced technology of the time, and throughout its history it has maintained that advantage. His first airplane was a Grumman vehicle and its first camera was a Fairchild. The service was absorbed by the Peruvian Air Force and took on various names, including that of "General Directorate of Aerial Photography" (Spanish: Dirección General de Aerofotografía).

The National Aerophotographic Service took the aerial photographs to prepare the basic cartography of the scale of 1 to 100,000. The charter was financed by the Defense Mapping Agency of the United States, who financed them and also the National Geographic Institute to prepare the country's National Charter.

It is presently focused on military operations with a priority of work against internal threats: illegal mining, terrorism in the VRAEM, illicit drug trafficking and risk management.

== See also ==
- Aerial photography
- Peruvian Air Force
