= NASU Institute of Environment Geochemistry =

Ukrainian research organization

NASU Institute for Environment Geochemistry
- Established: 1995
- Director: Yurii Leonidovych Zabulonov
- Location: Prospekt Akademika Palladina, 34a, Kyiv, Ukraine 03142
- Operating agency: National Academy of Sciences of Ukraine
- Website: www.igns.gov.ua

Institute for Environment Geochemistry of the National Academy of Sciences of Ukraine (KINR) (Ukrainian: Інститут геохімії навколишнього середовища НАН України, romanized: Instytut heokhimii navkolyshnoho seredovyshcha NAN Ukrainy) located in Kyiv, Ukraine.

== History ==
Decision on creation of the institute with dual subordination to the National Academy of Sciences of Ukraine and the Ministry of Emergencies was adopted on 29 December 1995. On 4 January 1996 a joint order of the academy and the Ministry was signed by Borys Paton and Volodymyr Kholosha (acting minister) on creation of the State science center of Surrounding Environment Radiation- and Geochemistry based on two departments of the NASU Institute of Geochemistry, Mineralogy, and Ore-creation (Department of surrounding environment radiation- and geochemistry and Department of metallogeny).

On 12 July 2000 the center was renamed as the NASU Institute of [Surrounding] Environment Geochemistry.

In 2012 the Ministry of Emergencies was liquidated (degraded to a state service under Ministry of Internal Affairs).

== Directors ==
- 1996 - 2013 Emlen Sobotovych
- 2013 - 2018 Heorhiy Lysychenko
- 2018 - Yurii L. Zabulonov

== Associated entities ==
- Kyiv science and production association "Ekolohichni tekhnolohiyi i normatyvy" (Ecological technologies and norms)
- State science and production small enterprise "Vidrodzhenia" (Revival)
- State enterprise "Ekoinform"
- Interagency scientific council on issues of radioactive waste management (Presidium of the NASU)
- Committee on meteorites (Department of Earth Sciences of the Presidium of the NASU)
- Branch of the National Aviation University Ecology Department
- The National Aviation University Ecology Department jointly with the National Aviation University Institute of Land Management and Information Technology
- NASU Center for collective use of unique scientific instruments "Mineraloho-heokhimichni doslidzhenia" (Mineral and geochemical research)
- others
