= National Geographic Institute (Peru) =

National mapping agency of Peru

- Instituto Geográfico Nacional
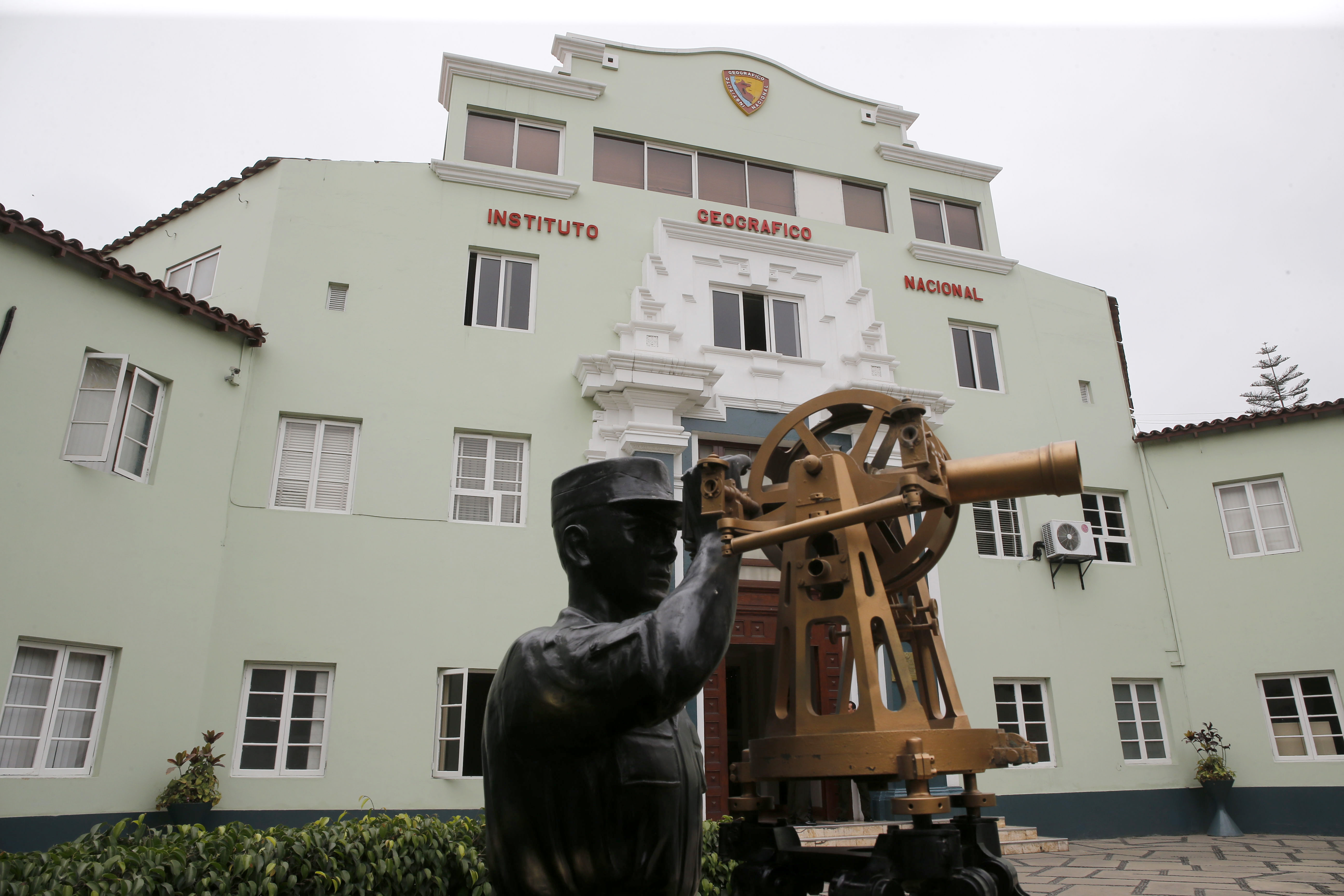
- Headquarters in Lima

Agency overview
- Formed: 13 April 1913
- Jurisdiction: Peru
- Headquarters: Lima
- Website: www.gob.pe/ign

The National Geographic Institute (Spanish: Instituto Geográfico Nacional) is the national mapping agency of Peru. It is a decentralized public organization attached to the Ministry of Defence, in charge of the elaboration of the official maps of the country and to support activities related to its development and defense. Its headquarters are located in Surquillo, Lima.

== History ==
On February 13, 1901, when the General Staff of the Army (EMGE) was reorganized and a fourth entity dedicated to topography and cartography was included. On March 6, 1906, President José Pardo y Barreda approved the topographic service under the EMGE.

On April 14, 1913, the Army Geographic Service (Servicio Geográfico del Ejército, SGE) was created as a dependency of the EMGE and with a supreme decree of May 14, 1913, the geographical map of Peru was prepared, a mission that until then was fulfilled by the Geographic Society of Lima.

With a supreme decree of May 10, 1921, President Augusto B. Leguía entrusted the direction of the SGE to French Colonel Georges Thomas, who established the bases for a "National Charter."

In 1938, a Map of Peru was published jointly with the Geographical Society of Lima, at a scale of 1:1,500,000, which was approved by President Oscar R. Benavides and contained the international borders, as well as the interior demarcation (supreme resolutions of November 12, 1934, and January 8, 1935). In 1944 the name of the SGE was changed to the Military Geographic Institute (Instituto Geográfico Militar, IGM).

By Supreme Decree of October 10, 1957, the Military Geographic Institute (IGM) is authorized to carry out aerial photogrammetry work for the survey of the National Chart.

Through Legislative Decree No. 30 of 1980, the IGM was renamed the National Geographic Institute (IGN), directly dependent on the Ministry of War and with the mission of preparing and updating the National Charter and providing cartographic support to the Army and other Institutes of the Armed Forces and the entities that require it for defense and development purposes.

By Law No. 24654 of March 31, 1987 and Legislative Decree No. 434 of September 27, 1987, the IGN was established as a Decentralized Public Organization of the defense sector.

On June 13, 2000, Law 27292 of the IGN was promulgated, including its organization and functions, technical directions; (Geography, GIS, Geodesy, Photogrammetry, Cartography, Reproduction; Cartographic School; Regional Directorates). Among the complementary Transitional and Final Provisions, there appears, as in previous legal regulations, the “Obligation of public and private entities to provide information of a geographic cartographic nature, to keep the Cartographic Database updated.”

== Chiefs ==
1. Lieutenant Colonel Carlos Méndez Prieto (1915–1919)
2. Colonel George Thomas (1921–1925)
3. Colonel José A. Vallejo F. (1925–1928)
4. Colonel Ricardo E. Llona (1928–1931)
5. Colonel Gerardo Dianderas Sánchez (1931–1939)
6. Colonel Bernardino Vallenas Fernández (1939–1946)
7. Colonel Gerardo Dianderas Sánchez (1946–1948)
8. Colonel Jorge Sarmiento Calmet (1948–1956)
9. Brigadier General Guillermo Barriga (1956–1963)
10. Colonel Luis Montezuma Delfín (1963–1965)
11. Colonel Enrique Falconi Mejía (Oct 1965–Dec 1966)
12. Brigadier General Marco Fernández Baca (Jan 1967–Jul 1968)
13. Brigadier General Marcial Rubio Escudero (Aug 1968–Dec 1970)
14. Brigadier General Luis Vignes Rodríguez (1972–1973)
15. Brigadier General Héctor Portocarrero Zubiate (Jan–Oct 1974)
16. Colonel Guillermo Fernández Dávila (Nov 1974–Dec 1975)
17. Colonel Oscar De Lama Lora (1976)
18. Colonel Luis Figari Ferreyra (1977)
19. Brigadier General Jorge Luna Salinas (1978)
20. Colonel Luis Figari Ferreyra (1979)
21. Brigadier General Luis Gonzales Cárdenas (1980)
22. Brigadier General Alberto Delgado Velasco (1981–1983)
23. Brigadier General Jorge Rosales Viera (1984–1987)
24. Brigadier General Sergio Valqui Casas (1988)
25. Colonel Luis Effio Alfaro (1989)
26. Brigadier General Juan León Varillas (1990–1991)
27. Brigadier General Alejandro Wendorff Rodríguez (1992–1993)
28. Brigadier General Alberto Delgado Bejarano (1994–1995)
29. Brigadier General Guillermo Rebagliati Escala (1996–1997)
30. Brigadier General José Herrera Rosas (1998–1999)
31. Brigadier General Luis Alberto Muñoz Díaz (2000)
32. Brigadier General Gustavo Bobbio Rosas (2001–2002)
33. Brigadier General Adolfo Carbajal Valdivia (2003–2004)
34. Brigadier General Vargas Vaca Francisco Antonio (2005–Sep 2006)
35. Divisional General (Ret.) Carlos Alfonso Tafur Ganoza (Sep 2006–2011)
36. Brigadier General Pedro Arturo Chocano Ochoa (2012–2013)
37. Brigadier General Jorge Helmutt Sanabria Monroy (2014)
38. Brigadier General Marco Merino Amand (2015–2016)
39. Brigadier General Marco Rodríguez Monge (2017–2018)
40. Brigadier General Fernando Portillo Romero (2019–2021)
41. Brigadier General Gonzalo Eduardo Cabrejos Ramos (2022)
42. Brigadier General Carlos Enrique Bojorquez Quiñonez (2023)
43. Brigadier General Robert Heli Valles Angulo (2024–present)

== See also ==
- National Aerophotographic Service
- INGEMMET
