= National Geographic Institute (Guatemala) =

Guatemalan scientific agency

- Instituto Geográfico Nacional

Agency overview
- Formed: December 29, 1964
- Preceding agency: Military Geographical Institute
- Jurisdiction: Government of Guatemala
- Headquarters: Avenida Las Américas 5-79, Zona 13, Guatemala City
- Agency executives: Ronaldo Estuardo Arango, Director General; Angel Nelson Baldizón, sub-director
- Parent agency: Ministry of Agriculture
- Website: www.ign.gob.gt

The National Geographic Institute of Guatemala (Spanish: Instituto Geográfico Nacional "Ingeniero Alfredo Obiols Gómez", (IGN)) is a scientific agency of the Guatemalan government.

== History ==
IGN was created on 29 December 1964. In the 1930s, cartographic projects were carried out by ad hoc mapping commissions which were primarily responsible for boundary surveys. The Department of Maps and Cartography (Departamento de Mapas y Cartografía) was created in 1945 and followed by the creation of the National Geographic Institute (Instituto Geográfico Nacional) in 1964.

In 1982 the agency was renamed to Military Geographical Institute (Instituto Geográfico Militar, IGM) after a merger with the Military Cartographic Service, and became a dependency of the Ministry of Defence. In January 1998, following the demilitarisation of state institutions stipulated in the Peace Accords, the IGN was reinstated as a dependency of the Ministry of Communications, Infrastructure and Housing, and became a dependency of the Ministry of Agriculture in September 2006.
