= National Geographic Institute (Spain) =

Spain government cartographic department

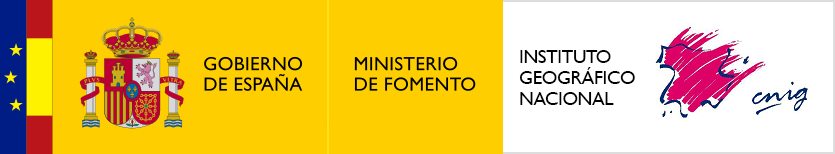
Official logo of the IGN

The National Geographic Institute (Spanish: Instituto Geográfico Nacional, IGN) is a government agency of the Spanish Ministry of Transport. Founded in 1870, it is the national mapping agency for Spain, together with the National Center for Geographic Information (Centro Nacional de Información Geográfica, CNIG).

Since 2015, most of its products (including MTN50 and MTN25 topographic maps, and PNOA aerial photographies) are freely available online, and licensed under a CC-BY-4.0-like license, as FOM/2807/2015 decree requires its products must be released under a free license.

== Roles ==
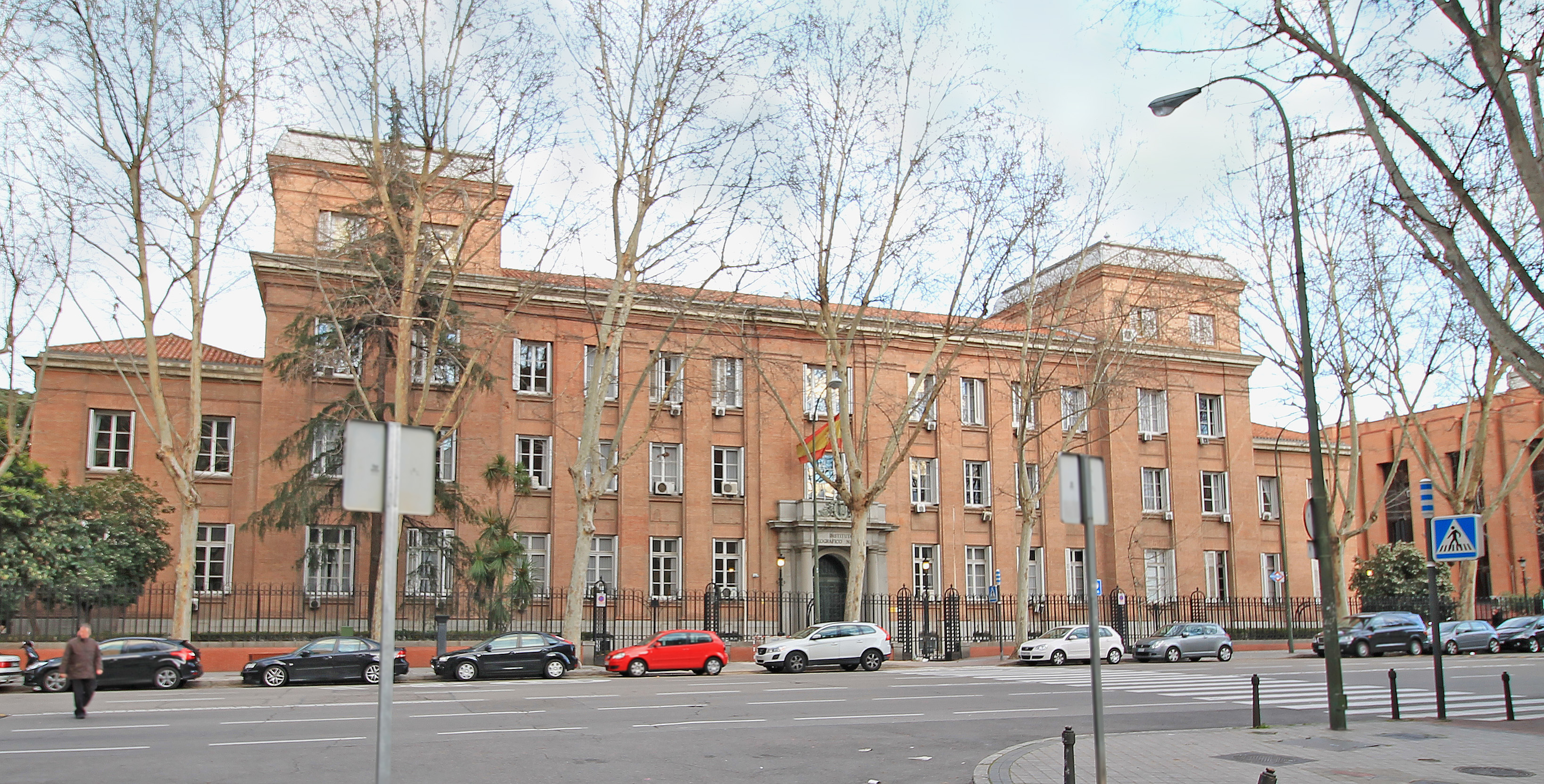
Headquarters (Madrid)

The IGN is responsible for:

1. Astronomic observations and research. Manages the Yebes Observatory, devoted to radio astronomy.
2. Observation and maintenance of the national geodetic networks
3. Making and updating the cartography for the country (including official National Topographic Maps, called MTN50 (1:50,000 scale) and MTN25 (1:25,000 scale))
4. Making and maintaining the Spanish Spatial Data Infrastructure (Infraestructura de Datos Espaciales de España, IDEE)
5. R&D and application of teledetection systems
6. Geophysics and gravimetry
7. Seismographic and volcanic activity analysis

== Main products ==
=== MTN50 ===
MTN50, acronym for Mapa Topográfico Nacional (National Topographic Map) scale 1:50,000, is produced by the National Geographic Institute (IGN), being obtained by direct processes of observation and measurement of the Earth's surface. It constitutes, together with the MTN25, the official basic cartography of Spain. It consists of a total of 1073 sheets.

Its original publication began in 1875 and did not finish until 1968. In 1985, the updating of its sheets was stopped, to focus all efforts on the production of the then new National Topographic Map at a scale of 1:25,000 (MTN25).

In 1999, the production of a new, completely renovated, MTN50 is resumed. This new MTN50 includes shading, and is generated by cartographic generalization processes, using digital technology, from the corresponding sheets of the MTN25. The publication of the first edition of this new digital MTN50 began in 1999, with sheet 605 (Aranjuez), and ended in 2010, with sheet 262 (Salvaterra de Miño), making a total of 1073 sheets.

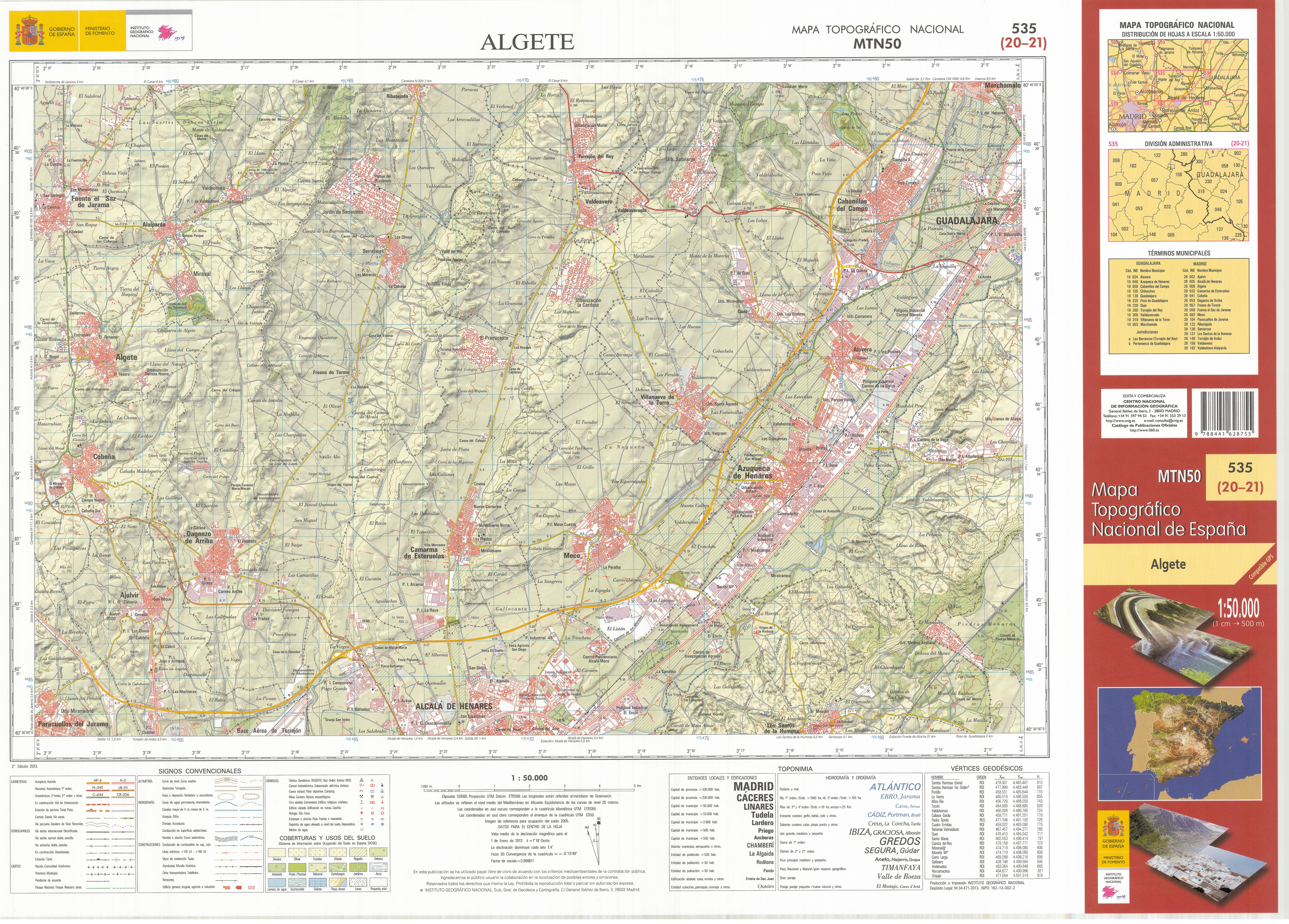
Sheet #535 (2013 version; second digital edition) of MTN50 Spanish National Topographic map series, covering Algete town (near Madrid) and its surroundings.

Special MTN50 sheet Madrid y su entorno (Madrid and its surroundings). First edition, 2012.

=== MTN25 ===
MTN25, acronym for Mapa Topográfico Nacional (National Topographic Map) scale 1:25,000, consists, as of October 2017, of 4,098 sheets in vector format and 4,102 in raster format, sheets of 5' latitude by 10' longitude, a distribution that inherits the distribution table of the MTN50, with each one of the MTN50 sheets being divided into four quarters that are identified with Roman numerals (each one of the quarters making a MTN25 sheet), with slight modifications for sheets that cover very little territory.

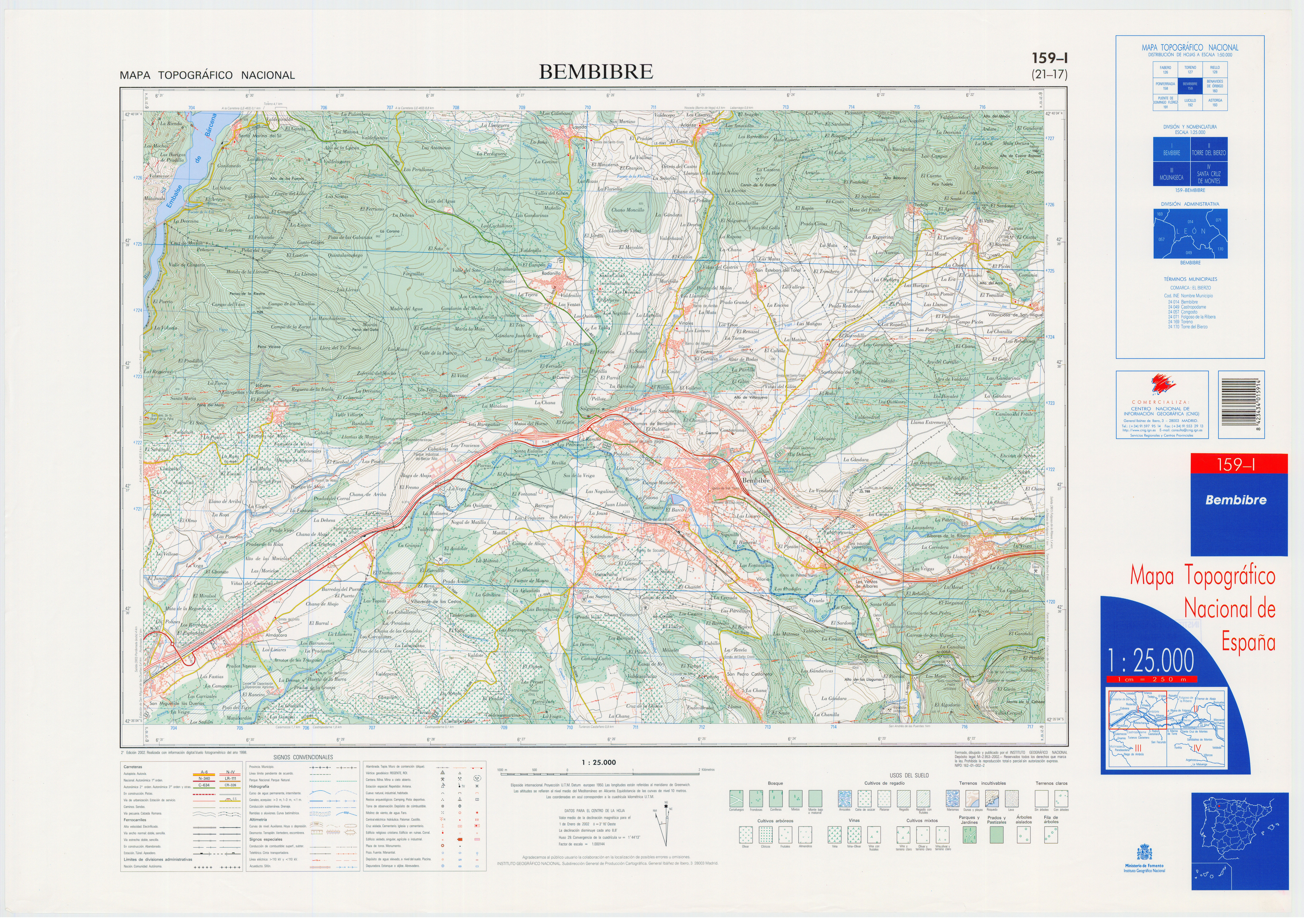
MTN25 sheet for Bembibre (2nd edition, 2002).

Madrid special MTN25 sheet (first edition, 1982).

=== PNOA ===
The National Plan for Aerial Orthophotography (Plan Nacional de Ortofotografía Aérea, abbreviated as PNOA) began in 2004 and aims to obtain digital aerial orthophotographs of the entire Spanish territory, with a fixed update period, currently 3 years.

The resolution of orthophotos has been changing over time and since 2017 the resolution is at least 25 cm, although in some areas resolutions of 15 cm are reached.

The PNOA is a cooperative project in which the Government of Spain and the Autonomous Communities participate. A single photogrammetric flight is carried out, and then a rigorous treatment of the data follows, in which technical specifications agreed upon by all the participating Public Administrations are complied. This approach of cooperative production between the different administrations is in accordance with the spirit of the Inspire Directive for the establishment of a Geographic Data Infrastructure in Europe, which seeks that the maximum level of detail of geographic information is captured only once and that it is shared openly among the different agents that need it.

== General directors ==
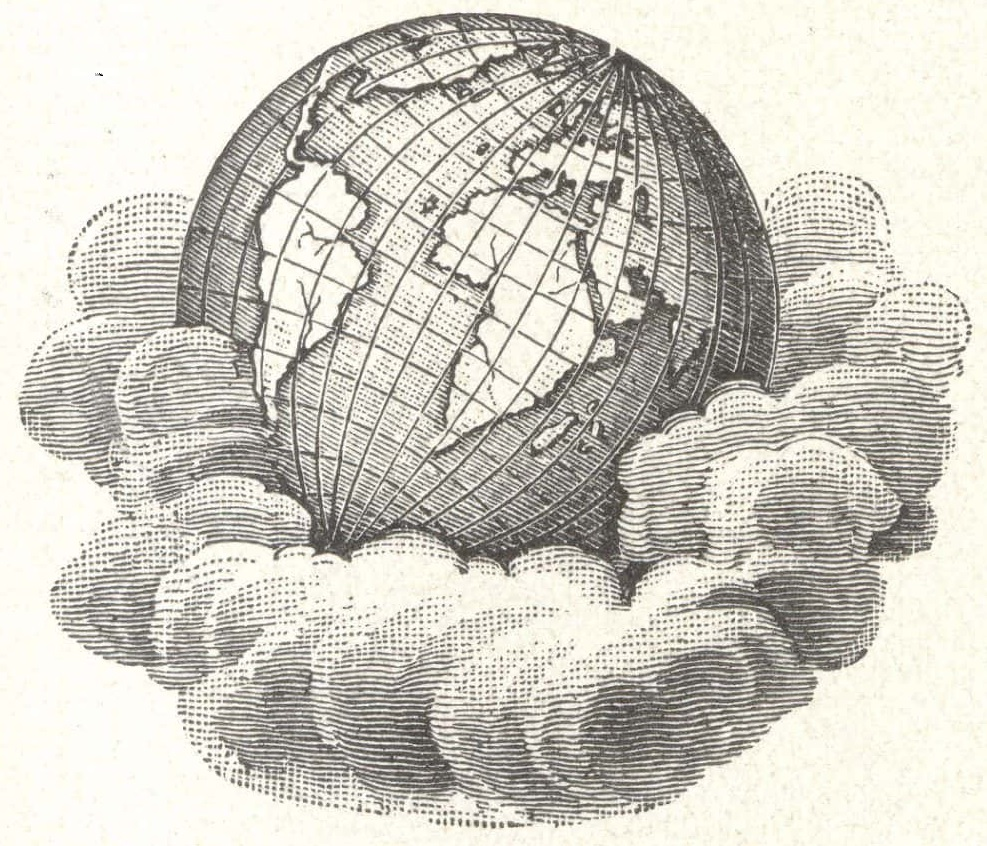
Former logo

- Carlos Ibáñez e Ibáñez de Ibero (1870–1889)
- Severo Gómez Núñez (1917, 1921–1922)
- Rodolfo Núñez de las Cuevas (1974–1980)
- Julio Morencos Tevar (1980–1983)
- Emilio Murcia Navarro (1983–1984)
- Ángel Arévalo Barroso (1985–1994)
- José Teófilo Serrano Beltrán (1994–1995)
- Ricardo Díaz Zoido (1995–1996)
- José Antonio Canas Torres (1996–2002)
- Alberto Sereno Álvarez (2002–2012)
- Amador Elena Córdoba (2012–2018)
- Lorenzo García Asensio (2018–2025)
- Laura Barbas Calvo (2025–present)
