= List of radio telescopes =

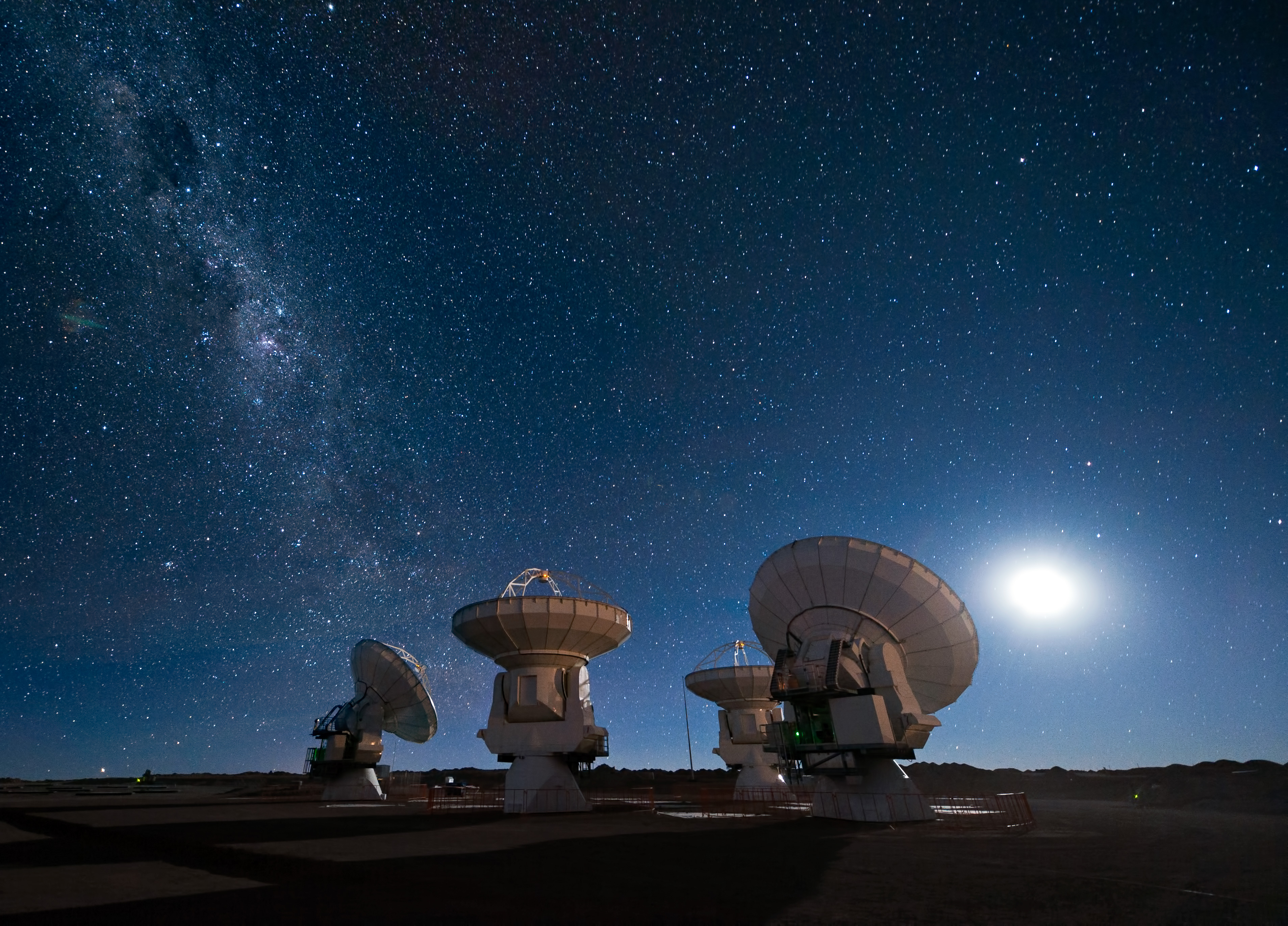
Four of the sixty-four total antennas of the ALMA radio telescope, at the Atacama Large Millimeter Array (ALMA)

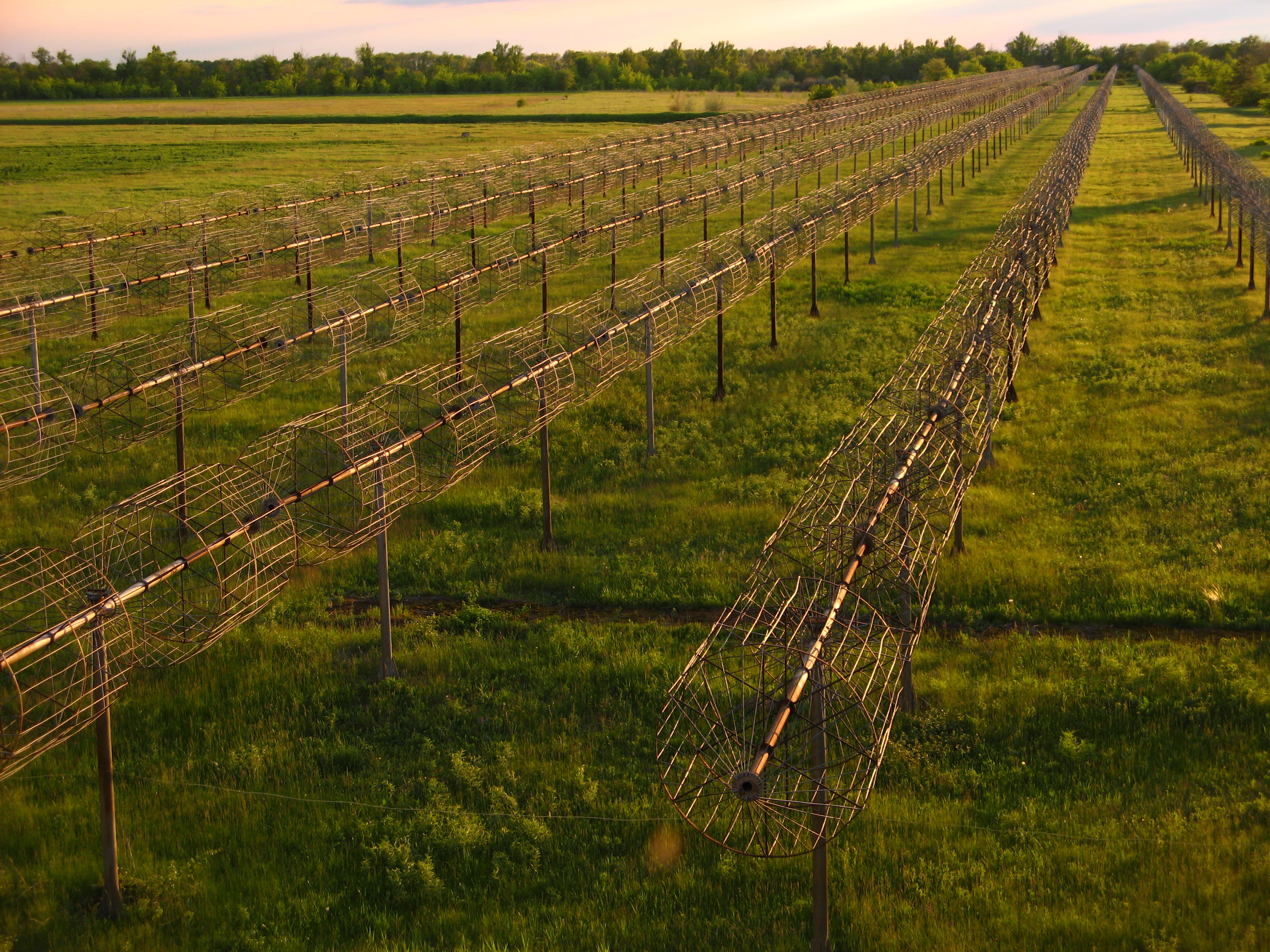
West arm of the low-frequency Ukrainian T-shaped Radio telescope, second modification (UTR-2) radio telescope phased array antenna

This is a list of radio telescopes – over one hundred – that are or have been used for radio astronomy. The list includes both single dishes and interferometric arrays. The list is sorted by region, then by name; unnamed telescopes are in reverse size order at the end of the list.

The first radio telescope was invented in 1932, when Karl Jansky at Bell Telephone Laboratories observed radiation coming from the Milky Way.

== Africa ==
Name	Location	Frequency Range	Remarks
AVN-Ghana	Kuntunse, Ghana	3.8–6.4, 5, 6.7 GHz	32-metre (104 foot) single dish, first of African VLBI Network
C-BASS South	Meerkat National Park, South Africa	4.5–5.5 GHz	7.6-metre (24.9 foot) dish with polarimeter back end
HartRAO 26m	Hartebeesthoek Radio Astronomy Observatory, Johannesburg, South Africa	1.66–23 GHz	26 m dish.
HartRAO XDM	Hartebeesthoek Radio Astronomy Observatory, Johannesburg, South Africa	2.3–8.65 GHz	15 m Experimental Demonstrator Model originally build as a technology demonstrator for MeerKAT
Hydrogen Epoch of Reionization Array (HERA)	Meerkat National Park, South Africa	50–200 MHz	In progress – currently nineteen 14 m reflectors with crossed dipole antennas as feed.
Hydrogen Intensity and Real-time Analysis eXperiment (HIRAX)	Meerkat National Park, South Africa	400–800 MHz	In progress – currently eight 6 m dishes with dual-polarization dipole antennas as feed at HartRAO.
Indlebe	Durban University of Technology, Durban, South Africa	1420 MHz	5 meter (16 foot) parabolic reflector
KAT-7	Meerkat National Park, South Africa	1200–1950 MHz	Seven, 12 meter (39 foot) dishes.
MeerKAT	Meerkat National Park, South Africa	0.58–14.5 GHz	Sixty four, 13.5 m dishes. A pathfinder for the Square Kilometre Array.
Precision Array for Probing the Epoch of Reionization (PAPER)	Meerkat National Park, South Africa	100–200 MHz	Now disassembled, PAPER at its maximum had 128 crossed dipole antennas, making it the interferometer with more elements than any other at that time.

== Antarctica ==
Name	Location	Frequency Range	Remarks
Degree Angular Scale Interferometer (DASI)	Amundsen–Scott South Pole Station	26–36 GHz	13-element interferometer measuring anisotropies in the cosmic microwave background.
South Pole Telescope (SPT)	Amundsen–Scott South Pole Station	95–350 GHz	10-m microwave telescope making observations of clusters using the Sunyaev-Zeldovich effect. Also participates in Event Horizon Telescope observations.
Antarctic Submillimeter Telescope and Remote Observatory (AST/RO)	Amundsen–Scott South Pole Station	230, 450–495, 800–820 GHz	1.7 m off-axis telescope for submillimeter astronomy at wavelengths between 0.2 and 2 mm. Operated with five heterodyne receivers at 230, 450–495 (two), and 800–820 GHz (single and four-pixel array), plus seven acousto-optical spectrometers. Located in the Dark Sector, ~1 km from the station. Operated 1995–2005 by the Harvard-Smithsonian Center for Astrophysics.
Three Gorges Antarctic Eye	Zhongshan Station, Antarctica	Radio to low-frequency millimetre-wave bands (incl. 1420 MHz HI line and NH_{3} lines)	3.2 m radio/millimetre-wave telescope, launched April 2025. Conducting observations of Milky Way neutral hydrogen and ammonia molecular spectral lines to study interstellar gas dynamics and star formation. Co-developed by China Three Gorges University and Shanghai Normal University.

== Asia ==
Name	Location	Frequency Range	Remarks
Delingha 13.7 m	Delingha, Qinghai, China	85–115 GHz	Dish diameter: 13.7 m. Site altitude: 3200 m. Operated by Purple Mountain Observatory.
Sheshan	Shanghai, China	1660 MHz	25 m. Operated by SHAO (Shanghai Astronomical Observatory)
Nanshan 25m	Ürümqi, China	1.4–18 GHz	L/C/S/X band receivers. 70 km south to Ürümqi. Operated by XAO (Xinjiang Astronomical Observatory).
Primeval Structure Telescope (PaST)	Xinjiang, China	50–200 MHz	PaST is planned to be an array of some ten-thousand log-periodic antennas spread over several square kilometers. Construction started in 2004.
Chinese Spectral Radio Heliograph (CSRH)	Inner Mongolia, China	0.4–15 GHz	CSRH is an interferometer under construction in China. The CSRH will consist of 100 telescopes covering 0.4–15 GHz. 40 telescopes of 4.5 m cover 400 MHz – 2 GHz and 60 telescopes of 2 m cover 2–15 GHz. CSRH will be one of the world's largest and most advanced imaging spectroscopy instruments. CSRH will be used to study coronal mass ejections. All of the 4.5m telescopes are assembled and the 2m telescopes will be assembled by 2013.
Miyun Synthesis Radio Telescope (MSRT)	Miyun, China	232 MHz	Array of 28 9-meter dishes, completed in 1984.
Miyun 50m Radio Telescope	Miyun, China	2–12 GHz	Built in 2005.
Kunming 40m Radio Telescope	Kunming, China	2–12 GHz	Built in 2006.
Tianlai experiment cylinder pathfinder telescope	Hongliuxia, Balikun, Xinjiang, China	500–1500 adjustable, currently 700–800 MHz	3 cylinder reflectors, including a total of 96 dual-polarization receiver feeds, built in 2016
Tianlai experiment dish pathfinder telescope	Hongliuxia, Balikun, Xinjiang, China	500–1500 adjustable, currently 700–800 MHz	16 dishes of 6m aperture, built in 2016
Tian Ma 65m Radio Telescope	Shanghai, China	1–50 GHz	Built in 2012. Operated by SHAO (Shanghai Astronomical Observatory)
Giant Metrewave Radio Telescope (GMRT)	Pune, Maharashtra, India	50–1420 MHz	Thirty 45 m wire dishes; largest telescope at meter wavelengths. Operated by the National Centre for Radio Astrophysics.
Ooty Radio Telescope (ORT)	Ooty, Tamil Nadu, India	326.5 MHz	The radio telescope is a 530-metre (1,740 ft) long and 30-metre (98 ft) tall cylindrical parabolic antenna. It operates at a frequency of 326.5 MHz with a maximum bandwidth of 15 MHz at the front end.
Gauribidanur Radio Observatory	Gauribidanur, Karnataka, India	40–150 MHz	Operated by (Indian Institute of Astrophysics). A Radioheliograph.
Nizamia Observatory	Japal-Rangapur Observatory, Hyderabad, Telangana, India	10 GHz (3 cm)	3 m (10-foot) radio telescope added in January 1980, funded by the University Grants Commission. Originally installed to observe the solar eclipse of 16 February 1980; used for mapping solar radio emissions and galactic radio sources. Part of the historic Nizamia Observatory (founded 1908), relocated to Japal-Rangapur to avoid light pollution.
Nobeyama radio observatory	Nagano Prefecture, Japan	17–115 GHz	A 45 m single-dish short-millimetre telescope, and six 10 m telescopes of the Nobeyama Millimetre Array (NMA), both operated by the National Astronomical Observatory of Japan (NAOJ)
Siberian Solar Radio Telescope (SSRT)	Badary, Buryatia, Russia	5.7 GHz	The SSRT is a crossed interferometer, consisting of two arrays of 128x128 parabolic antennas 2.5 meters in diameter each, spaced equidistantly at 4.9 meters and oriented in the E-W and N-S directions. The SSRT is a special-purpose solar radio telescope designed for studying solar activity in the microwave range (5.7 GHz).
Badary Radio Astronomical Observatory	Badary, Buryatia, Russia	1.4–22 GHz	32 m RT-32 radio telescope, operating range 1.4–22 GHz.
Tien Shan Astronomical Observatory	Big Almaty Gorge, Almaty, Kazakhstan		12 m radio telescope used for solar radio observations and tracking artificial satellites. Located at 2,800 m altitude. Founded in 1957; operated by the Fesenkov Astrophysical Institute (FAPHI). Also houses optical telescopes including two 1 m Ritchey-Chretien reflectors.
Galenki RT-70 radio telescope	Galenki (Ussuriysk), Russia	5–300 GHz	RT-70, 70 m telescope, operating range 5–300 GHz
Suffa RT-70 radio telescope	Suffa plateau, Uzbekistan	5–300 GHz	RT-70, the construction started in 1981 but was never completed.
Five hundred meter Aperture Spherical Telescope (FAST)	Guizhou, China	70–3000 MHz	500m radio telescope, the world's largest filled-aperture radio telescope, operating range 70–3000 MHz.
Qitai Radio Telescope	Qitai County, Xinjiang, China	300 MHz–117 GHz	Construction work started in 2012. Will be operated by XAO (Xinjiang Astronomical Observatory).
Thai National Radio Telescope	Chiang Mai, Thailand	300 MHz–115 GHz	Construction work started in 2017. A 40m single-dish short-millimetre telescope, operated by the National Astronomical Research Institute of Thailand (NARIT).
VERA	Japan	6.7 GHz–43 GHz	A VLBI system with four 20-m telescopes in Japan (Mizusawa, Chichijima, Iriki, Ishigaki island) operated by the National Astronomical Observatory of Japan (NAOJ).
Usuda Deep Space Center	Saku, Nagano Prefecture, Japan	S-band (2 GHz), X-band (8 GHz)	64 m parabolic antenna (1,980 tons total weight), built by Mitsubishi Electric and operational since 1984. Japan's primary ground station for deep space exploration, supporting missions including Hayabusa, Hayabusa2, and Akatsuki. Ka-band capability added in 2021 via the GREAT project. Operated by JAXA/ISAS.
Kashima 34-m Radio Telescope	Kashima, Ibaraki Prefecture, Japan	1.35–43 GHz	34 m parabolic antenna installed in 1988; the first large antenna in Japan dedicated to VLBI. Participated in global geodetic VLBI for the IVS and supported the VSOP space VLBI mission. Featured a steerable sub-reflector and multi-receiver trolley system. Irreparably damaged by a typhoon in 2019. Operated by NICT.
Daocheng Solar Radio Telescope	Sichuan province, China	150 MHz–450 MHz	313 parabolic antennas for detection of coronal mass ejection events. Operations started in 2023.
Mingantu interplanetary scintillation telescope	Inner Mongolia, China	327 MHz and 654 MHz	interplanetary scintillation telescope, consists of three rotatable cylindrical antennas (140 metres by 40 metres each).
Taeduk Radio Astronomy Observatory (TRAO)	Daejeon, Republic of Korea	86–115 GHz	TRAO was established in October 1986 with the 13.7 meter Radio Telescope. It opened the new era of the millimeter-wave radio astronomy in Korea as one of the main facilities of Korea Astronomy and Space science Institute (KASI). It is operated by Radio astronomy division in KASI.
Korean VLBI Network (KVN)	Republic of Korea	22/43/86/129 GHz	KVN consists of four 21-m radio telescopes located in Seoul, Ulsan, Jeju Island and Pyeongchang (Constructing), Republic of Korea. They have an identical design and are equipped with a quasi-optical system that allows simultaneous observations at 22, 43, 86, and 129 GHz. Since August in 2013, KVN Ulsan have started to operate 6.7 GHz in single-dish and VLBI modes.

== Australia ==
Name	Location	Frequency Range	Remarks
Australian Square Kilometre Array Pathfinder (ASKAP)	Murchison Radio-astronomy Observatory, Western Australia	700–1800 MHz	ASKAP, the Australian Square Kilometre Array Pathfinder, is operated by CSIRO. It is made up of 36 identical antennas, each 12 metres in diameter, with a 30 sq degrees FoV at 1.4 GHz.
Australia Telescope Compact Array (ATCA)	Paul Wild Observatory, Narrabri, New South Wales	0.3–110 GHz	6x22m dish aperture synthesis array, operated by CSIRO as part of the ATNF (Australia Telescope National Facility).
Canberra Deep Space Communication Complex (CDSCC)	Tidbinbilla, Australian Capital Territory		1x70 m dish, 3x34 m dishes, operated by CSIRO on behalf of NASA.
Ceduna Radio Observatory	Ceduna, South Australia	1.2–23 GHz	30 m telescope, operated by the University of Tasmania
Molonglo Observatory Synthesis Telescope (MOST)	Molonglo (near Canberra, Australian Capital Territory)	600–1200 MHz	Operated by the School of Physics at the University of Sydney. East-west arm of the former Molonglo Cross Telescope, approximately 1.6 km in length. Operates at 843 MHz.
Mopra Radio Telescope	Mopra Telescope, near Coonabarabran, New South Wales	0.3–100 GHz	22 m dish, operated by CSIRO as part of the ATNF (Australia Telescope National Facility).
Mount Pleasant Radio Telescope	Hobart, Tasmania	1.2–23 GHz	26 m telescope, operated by the University of Tasmania
Murchison Widefield Array (MWA)	Murchison Radio-astronomy Observatory, Western Australia	70–300 MHz	Fixed 256 array of 16-element dual-polarisation antennas covering 70–300 MHz with approximately 30° field-of-view using electronic beam-forming
Parkes Radio Telescope (Murriyang)	Parkes Observatory, New South Wales		64 m telescope (2nd largest movable dish in the Southern Hemisphere), operated by CSIRO as part of the ATNF (Australia Telescope National Facility).

== Europe ==
Name	Location	Frequency Range	Remarks
Effelsberg 100-m Radio Telescope	Bad Münstereifel-Effelsberg near Bonn, Germany	395 MHz – 95 GHz	100 m fully steerable dish operated by Max Planck Institut für Radioastronomie, operates at 395 MHz to 95 GHz
Ukrainian T-shaped Radio telescope, second modification (UTR-2)	Volokhiv Yar, Kharkiv, Ukraine	8–33 MHz	World's largest radio telescope at decametre wavelengths (max. collective area 150,000 m^{2}).
Giant Ukrainian Radio Telescope (GURT)	Volokhiv Yar, Kharkiv, Ukraine	8–80 MHz	Low-frequency radio telescope of new generation. Construction is in progress, separate 25-element subarrays are used for observations of Sun, Jupiter, pulsars.
Lovell Telescope	Jodrell Bank Observatory, Cheshire, England	0–2 GHz	76 m dish
Yevpatoria RT-70 radio telescope	former soviet Center for deep space communications, Yevpatoria, Crimea	5–300 GHz	RT-70, 70 m telescope, operating range 5–300 GHz
Madrid Deep Space Communications Complex (MDSCC)	Robledo de Chavela, Madrid, Spain	L/S/X/Ka-band (1–32 GHz)	Part of NASA's Deep Space Network. Principal antenna is the 70 m DSS-63; also has several 34 m beam-waveguide antennas. Transmits in S and X-band; receives in L, S, X, and Ka-band.
RATAN-600	Zelenchukskaya, Russia	0.61–30 GHz	600 m dish, operates at 610 MHz to 30 GHz, world's largest diameter individual radio telescope
RT-64 (TNA-1500)	Kalyazin, Russia	5.86 GHz	64 m fully steerable dish, up to 5.86 GHz
RT-64 (TNA-1500)	Medvezhji Ozera (Bear Lakes), Russia	5.86 GHz	64 m fully steerable dish, up to 5.86 GHz
RT-22	Pushchino, Russia		Four 22 m fully steerable radio telescopes. At the 1960s the centimeter and millimeter-wavelength RT-22s had a world record-breaking high angular resolution for individual radio telescopes. Operated by the Pushchino Radio Astronomy Observatory.
DKR-1000	Pushchino, Russia		DKR-1000 is the world largest telescope operating in the meter wavelength range. A wide-band radio telescope instrument consists of two parabolic cylinders 1 km long and 40 m width. One cylinder extend from east to west and the 2nd from north to south. DKR-1000 has a high sensitivity and the telescope allows simultaneous observations at any wavelengths in the range from 2.5m to 10m. Operated by the Pushchino Radio Astronomy Observatory.
BSA	Pushchino, Russia		BSA is a Large Phased Array comprising over 16,000 dipoles and covering an area of 7.2 hectares. The BSA has a world record sensitivity in the meter wavelength range. Operated by the Pushchino Radio Astronomy Observatory.
Radioastronomical Observatory Zelenchukskaya	Karachaevo-Cherkessiya, Russia	1.4–22 GHz	32m RT-32 radio telescope, operating range 1.4–22 GHz.
Svetloe Radio Astronomical Observatory	Svetloe, Karelia, Russia	1.4–22 GHz	32m RT-32 radio telescope, operating range 1.4–22 GHz.
RT-7.5 (Bauman's radio telescope)	Moscow Oblast, Russia		Two 7.75-meter diameter antennas (only one is working at the moment)
Wettzell Radio Telescopes	Wettzell, Bavaria, Germany	S/X-band (2–8 GHz)	20 m RTW telescope (operational since 1983) and two 13.2 m TWIN telescopes (TTW1/TTW2, inaugurated 2013) for VLBI geodesy. Part of the IVS network. Operated by the Federal Agency for Cartography and Geodesy (BKG) and the Technical University of Munich.
Yebes RT 40 m	Spanish National Observatory, Yebes, Guadalajara, Spain		40 m parabolic steerable telescope for mm and cm wavelengths
Toruń RT4 32 m	Toruń Centre for Astronomy, Toruń, Poland		RT4 (32 m) parabolic antenna
RT-32	Ventspils International Radio Astronomy Center, Irbene, Latvia		32-meter fully steerable parabolic, centimetre-wave range antenna RT-32
Northern Cross Radio Telescope	Medicina Radio Observatory, Medicina, Bologna, Italy	408 MHz	32000 m^{2} interferometer, cylindrical-paraboloid steerable over NS., 408 MHz, Beam=3'
32 m VLBI dish	Medicina Radio Observatory, Medicina, Bologna, Italy	1.4–43 GHz	32 m, fully steerable dish, 1400 MHz...43 GHz
32 m VLBI dish	Noto Radio Observatory, Noto, Italy,	0.3–86 GHz	32 m, fully steerable dish, 300 MHz – 86 GHz. Operates both as part of astronomical and geodetic VLBI network and as a single dish.
Chilbolton Observatory	Chilbolton, Hampshire, England	LOFAR-UK below 250 MHz	LOFAR-UK station with 96 LBA and 96 HBA antennas. Operated by STFC.
MERLIN (Multi-Element Radio Linked Interferometer Network)	United Kingdom	151 MHz – 24 GHz	Consists of the Cambridge 32 m at Mullard Radio Astronomy Observatory, Darnhall, Defford, Tabley (also known as Pickmere) and Knockin. Also includes the Lovell and Mark II telescopes at Jodrell Bank.
Bleien Radio Observatory	Gränichen, Switzerland	10 MHz – 5 GHz	Two parabolic antennas (7 m and 5 m diameter) separated by 100 m. The 5 m dish observes at 980–1300 MHz. Used primarily for solar radio spectroscopy and galactic mapping. Operated by ETH Zurich.
EAARO – East Anglian Astrophysical Research Organisation	Cambridgeshire, England	0–11 GHz	A scientific and educational charitable company currently constructing a Radio Observatory and Ground Station in Cambridgeshire
TNA-400	Center for deep space communications, Simferopol, Crimea		TNA-400, 32 m telescope
IRAM – 30m	Pico Veleta, in Granada, Spain		30m dish operated by the Institute for Millimetric Radio Astronomy (Institut de radioastronomie millimétrique, IRAM); works in the millimeter range (1mm to 3mm) both with superheterodyne and bolometric detectors.
Mark II	Jodrell Bank Observatory, Cheshire, England	0–24 GHz	25 m dish
Stockert	Bad Münstereifel-Eschweiler near Bonn, Germany		25 m dish operated by University of Bonn and Max Planck Institut für Radioastronomie, closed in 1993, now owned by NRW-Stiftung, reopened 2010 after restoration and operated by Förderverein Astropeiler Stockert
Toruń RT3 15 m	Toruń Centre for Astronomy, Toruń, Poland		RT3 (15 m) antenna.
Westerbork Synthesis Radio Telescope (WSRT)	Westerbork, Netherlands		2.8 km array of 14 25-meter dishes operated by ASTRON
Blackrock Castle Observatory	Cork, Ireland		Radio telescope at Munster Technological University (MTU) campus; used for educational outreach and messaging nearby stars. Also hosts research labs and a planetarium.
25 m telescope	Onsala Space Observatory, Onsala, Sweden		25 m telescope
Dwingeloo (CAMRAS)	Dwingeloo, Netherlands		25 m steerable dish, formerly operated by ASTRON, now operated by CAMRAS
22 m telescope	Simeiz Observatory, Simeiz, Crimea		22-m radio telescope for mm and cm radio waves. Located at the foot of mount Koshka (Cat) in Katsiveli (near Simeiz). Belongs to the Crimean Astrophysical Observatory, the Department of Radioastronomy.
20 m telescope	Onsala Space Observatory, Onsala, Sweden		20 m telescope
Pluton (complex)	Center for deep space communications, Yevpatoria, Crimea		8 mirrors with diameter of 16 meters. Square is 1000 sq. meters.
RT-16	Ventspils International Radio Astronomy Center, Irbene, Latvia		16-meter diameter antenna RT-16
Norman Lockyer Observatory	Sidmouth, Devon, England		Heritage observatory (founded 1912) with the Lockyer Technology Centre (opened 2012) housing radio astronomy systems for meteor detection and amateur radio astronomy.
KAIRA	Kilpisjärvi, Enontekiö, Finland		30 m × 50 m, 768-element phased array and a 34 m diameter, 48-element phased array
Metsähovi Radio Observatory	Kylmälä, Kirkkonummi, Finland	2–150 GHz	13.7 m dish, operates at 2 to 150 GHz, surface accuracy 0.1 mm (rms).
Ryle Telescope	Mullard Radio Astronomy Observatory, Cambridge, England		Eight 13 m dishes, and is currently used as one part of the Arcminute Microkelvin Imager.
Erciyes University Radio Observatory	Kayseri, Turkey		12.8 m dish
Wurzburg v2.0 LAB/OASU (Bordeaux Observatory radio telescope)	Floirac, Gironde, France	1.4–1.7 GHz	7.5 meter diameter antenna. Observable frequency range : 1.4–1.7 GHz. Bandwidth ≈9.2 MHz
European VLBI Network (EVN)	Distributed across Europe with members in China, South Africa and the US		VLBI array operated by the European Consortium for VLBI
Plateau de Bure Interferometer	Plateau de Bure, Grenoble, France		Originally an array of 3 antennas, since 2005 has 6 antennas, operating at millimeter wavelengths, now part of NOEMA
Northern Extended Millimeter Array (NOEMA)	Plateau de Bure, Grenoble, France		12 antennas, operating at millimeter wavelengths (Operational: 2019).
Nançay Radio Telescope (NRT)	Nançay, France		NRT website (fr)
Nançay Decameter Array (DAM)	Nançay, France	10–100 MHz	DAM website (fr)
Nançay Radio Heliographe (NRH)	Nançay, France	150–450 MHz	NRH website (fr)
ALLBIN (Amateur Linked Long Baseline Interferometer Network)	Germany		A Small Network of Radio Telescopes and Radio Spectrographs doing Amateur Radio Astronomy at a Very High standard coordinated by The European Radio Astronomy Club Research and Development Telescope in Mannheim Germany.
LOFAR (LOw Frequency ARray)	Netherlands, Germany, Great Britain, France, Sweden, Poland, Ireland; in future possibly other countries	10–240 MHz	Low frequency array of dipole antennas at 1.25 to 30m wavelengths (10–240 MHz), with a strongly distributed signal processing system. The telescope beam is constructed in software from combinations of antenna signals. Operated by ASTRON
São Gião radio telescope (SGRT)	São Gião, Portugal	0.4–22 GHz	9.3 m solid surface dish, operated by PARAC
Arcminute Microkelvin Imager	Mullard Radio Astronomy Observatory, Cambridge, England		Small Array consists of 10 3.7-m parabolic antennas
The European Radio Astronomy Club Telescope and Development Facility (ERAC Telescope)	Mannheim, Germany		From 14 kHz VLF up to 40 GHz
ERAC Phased Array	The European Radio Astronomy Club, Elsass, France		Phased array and Digital back end based on the SKA design
ERAC Phased Array	The European Radio Astronomy Club, East Lothian, Scotland		Phased array and Digital back end based on the SKA design
64 m Sardinia Radio Telescope	San Basilio, Sardinia, Italy		Sardinia Radio Telescope. 64 m dish.
ROT-54/2.6	Mount Aragats, Armenia, near Yerevan	1.5–300 GHz	Radio optical Telescope with 54 m Spherical Reflector Antenna and 2.6 m optical telescope on the same axis. One of the most sensitive and low noise antennas in the world. Operating during 1987–2010. Conserved from 2015. It is planned to revitalize it in 2020–2025 by the force of Armenian and International science-technical society. However a 2019 video report shows that the place has been abandoned and scavenged.
Bayfordbury Observatory	Hertfordshire, UK	1.4 GHz	4.5 m single dish, and 115 m baseline 3 dish interferometer. Operated by the University of Hertfordshire

== North America ==
Name	Location	Frequency Range	Remarks
Algonquin 46m radio telescope	Algonquin Radio Observatory, Algonquin Park, Ontario, Canada		46 metre fully steerable dish operated by Thoth Technology, Canada's largest single-dish radio telescope.
Allen Telescope Array	Hat Creek Radio Observatory, Hat Creek, California, US	0.5–11.5 GHz	42 6-m gregorian offset dishes using log periodic cooled feed covering 0.5–11.5 GHz. Operated by joint agreement between SRI International and the SETI Institute
ARO 12m Radio Telescope	Kitt Peak National Observatory, Tucson, Arizona, US		Previously operated by the NRAO, this telescope is currently operated by the University of Arizona's Arizona Radio Observatory, part of Steward Observatory.
C-BASS North	Owens Valley Radio Observatory, Big Pine, California, US	4.5–5.5 GHz	6.1 metre dish with polarimeter back end. This telescope was decommissioned in April 2015.
Canadian Hydrogen Intensity Mapping Experiment (CHIME)	Dominion Radio Astrophysical Observatory, Kaleden, British Columbia, Canada	400–800 MHz	A novel drift scan telescope, which consists of four 100 × 20 meter 5 m focal length cylinders, with an array of 256 dual-polarized radio receivers along the focus. Will map the 21 cm line of neutral hydrogen over the cosmological redshift range of 0.8 to 2.5. Collected its first light in September 2017.
CfA 1.2 m Millimeter-Wave Telescope	Center for Astrophysics | Harvard & Smithsonian, Cambridge, Massachusetts, US	115 GHz	A small radio telescope which, along with a twin instrument in Chile, has been continuously mapping interstellar carbon monoxide since the 1970s.
Combined Array for Research in Millimeter-wave Astronomy (CARMA)	Owens Valley Radio Observatory, Big Pine, California, US	75–345 GHz	Heterogeneous interferometer array composed of 6 10-m elements, 9 6-m elements, and 8 3.5-m elements covering frequencies ranging from 27 to 36 GHz, 80 to 115 GHz, and 215 to 265 GHz. Operated by joint agreements between Radio Astronomy Laboratory University of California, Berkeley, Caltech, University of Maryland, College Park, University of Illinois Urbana-Champaign, and the University of Chicago.
Distributed Array Radio Telescope (DART)	https://erau-prescott-observatory.com/ Embry-Riddle Radio Observatory, Prescott AZ], US	100–300 MHz	Array of three 16-element dual-polarization tiles with electronic beam-forming. Identical to the original MWA design
Dominion Radio Astrophysical Observatory	Kaleden, British Columbia, Canada	408–1420 MHz	Synthesis telescope consists of seven 9-metre (30 ft) parabolic antennas, three of which are movable along a 600-metre rail line.
DSA-110	Owens Valley Radio Observatory, Big Pine, California, US	1280–1530 MHz	Array of 110 dishes of 5 meter diameter. Optimized for detecting and localizing fast radio bursts.
Deep Synoptic Array	Spring Valley, White Pine County, Nevada, US	700–2000 MHz	Array of 1650 dishes of 6.15 meter diameter; main goal is an imaging sky survey. Currently under construction.
Five College Radio Astronomy Observatory (FCRAO)	Amherst, Massachusetts, US		Operated by UMass Amherst
Goldstone Radio Telescope	Mojave Desert, California, US		One of the most sensitive radars in the world
Green Bank Interferometer (GBI)	Green Bank, West Virginia, US		Three 26 meters (85 feet) radio telescopes formerly operated by NRAO, and now kept by GBO as a historic telescope.
Green Bank Telescope (GBT)	Green Bank, West Virginia, US	0.29–2.6 GHz; 2.95–7.8 GHz; 8–10 GHz; 12–15.4 GHz; 18–47 GHz; 67–100 GHz.	World's largest 100-metre (330 ft) fully steerable single-dish radio telescope
Green Bank 140 Foot Telescope (140foot)	Green Bank, West Virginia, US	0.75–15.0 GHz (2–40 cm)	43 m equatorial mount single-dish radio telescope. Currently awaiting its next mission.
Green Bank 20m Telescope	Green Bank, West Virginia, US		20m telescope, fully automated and accessed through the University of North Carolina's Skynet Robotic Telescope Network.
Haystack Observatory	Westford, Massachusetts, US		37 m radome-enclosed 90 GHz radar/radiotelescope; 9 m radar for space debris tracking, 46 m incoherent scatter radar, 26 m L-band deep space tracking radar, 18 m radiotelescope used for geodesy. Operated by the Massachusetts Institute of Technology
Heinrich Hertz Submillimeter Telescope (SMT)	Mount Graham, Arizona, US		10-meter radio telescope operated by the University of Arizona's Arizona Radio Observatory, part of Steward Observatory.
Hydrogen Epoch of Reionization Array (HERA)	Embry-Riddle Radio Observatory, Prescott AZ, US	100–200 MHz	Single 14-meter reflector used for testing of the main HERA telescope. (Under Construction)
Large Millimeter Telescope (LMT)	Sierra Negra, Puebla, Mexico		A 50-meter telescope for observations at millimetre wavelengths, the largest single dish instrument operating in this wavelength band.
Leuschner Observatory	Lafayette, California, US		A 4.5-meter single dish, prototype dish for the Allen Telescope Array
Long Wavelength Array (LWA)	Socorro, New Mexico, US	10–88 MHz	A telescope composed of stations each with 256 crossed-dipole antennas operated by the University of New Mexico and the Naval Research Laboratory. The first station (LWA1) is 50 miles west of Socorro, colocated with the VLA. The second station is at the Sevilleta National Wildlife Refuge 20 miles north of Socorro. Additional stations are planned.
Morehead State University 21m.	Morehead, Kentucky, US		A 21 m. telescope used for academic research and satellite data retrieval and control.
Paul Plishner Radio Astronomy and Space Sciences Center	Haswell, Kiowa County, Colorado, US		An 18-meter telescope under development since 2010 for use by educators in Colorado and others. Sponsored by the Deep Space Exploration Society of Boulder County, Colorado
Occidental College SRT (Small Radio Telescope), Hameetman Science Center	Los Angeles, California, US		A 2.3-meter satellite dish on a fully steerable, motorized azimuth-elevation mount with a low-noise amplifier and super-heterodyne receiver running SRT/VSRT (version 7.5). Currently inactive.
OVRO 40 meter Telescope	Owens Valley Radio Observatory, Big Pine, California, US	15 GHz	This cm wavelength telescope operated by Caltech, is currently being used on a blazar monitoring program at 15 GHz.
Owens Valley Solar Array	Owens Valley Radio Observatory, Big Pine, California, US	1–18 GHz	This cm wavelength interferometric telescope operated by New Jersey Institute of Technology, observes the solar corona from 1–18 GHz.
Peach Mountain Observatory	Ann Arbor, Michigan, US		26m telescope built in 1958, operated by the University of Michigan. Currently undergoing renovation.
Precision Array for Probing the Epoch of Reionization (PAPER)	Green Bank, West Virginia, US	100–200 MHz	Thirty-two crossed-dipole antennas measuring 100–200 MHz
Solar monitor, two 1.8 m dishes	Dominion Radio Astrophysical Observatory, Kaleden, British Columbia, Canada		The first dish here was originally a backup for the Algonquin site, but later the ARO instrument was moved to DRAO and this antenna became its backup.
Stanford Dish, or the SRI International Antenna Facility	Palo Alto, California, US		45.7 m parabolic reflector. Owned by the U.S. Government and constructed by SRI on land leased from Stanford University, the Antenna Facility is known locally as "The Dish".
Synthesis Telescope, seven-element interferometer	Dominion Radio Astrophysical Observatory, Kaleden, British Columbia, Canada		
Very Large Array (VLA)	Socorro, New Mexico, US		Array of 27 dishes. Part of NRAO.
Very Small Array (VSA)	Cogan Station, Pennsylvania, US		Array of 8 small dishes. Part of The SETI League's Project Argus initiative.
Very Long Baseline Array (VLBA)	Socorro, New Mexico US (operations center)		Array system of 10 radio telescopes; dishes are located at Mauna Kea, Hawaii, Owens Valley, California, Brewster, Washington, Kitt Peak, Arizona, Pie Town, New Mexico, Los Alamos, New Mexico, Fort Davis, Texas, North Liberty, Iowa, Hancock, New Hampshire, and St. Croix, U.S. Virgin Islands.
Pisgah Astronomical Research Institute (PARI)	Rosman, North Carolina, US	327 MHz, 1.4 and 4.8 GHz	Two 26m telescopes: 26 West and East. One 12m telescope, fully automated and accessed via PARI"s website.

== South America ==
Name	Location	Frequency Range	Remarks
Atacama B-Mode Search (ABS)	Llano de Chajnantor Observatory, Atacama Desert, Chile	127–163 GHz	60 cm telescope located on Cerro Toco and designed to measure the polarization of the CMB.
Atacama Cosmology Telescope (ACT)	Llano de Chajnantor Observatory, Atacama Desert, Chile		6 m telescope located on Cerro Toco.
Simons Observatory	Cerro Toco, Atacama Desert, Chile	27–285 GHz	One 6 m Large Aperture Telescope (LAT) with crossed Dragone optics and three 0.5 m Small Aperture Telescopes (SATs), housing approximately 60,000 transition-edge sensor bolometers across six spectral bands (27, 39, 93, 145, 225, and 280 GHz). Located at 5,200 m altitude. Designed to measure the polarization of the cosmic microwave background. Funded by the Simons Foundation.
Atacama Large Millimeter Array (ALMA)	Llano de Chajnantor Observatory, Atacama Desert, Chile	35–950 GHz	54 dishes with 12-m diameter and 12 dishes with 7 m diameter, sensitive to wavelengths between radio and infrared (submillimetre astronomy).
Atacama Pathfinder Experiment (APEX)	Llano de Chajnantor Observatory, Atacama Desert, Chile	159–738 GHz	12 m telescope located at the Chajnantor plateau.
Atacama Submillimeter Telescope Experiment (ASTE)	Llano de Chajnantor Observatory, Atacama Desert, Chile	270 GHz	10 m telescope located at Pampa La Bola. This was a pathfinder instrument for ALMA, and features an AzTEC millimeter camera in the focal plane of the dish, consisting of 144 silicon nitride micromesh bolometer pixels arranged in a compact hexagonal package.
Brazilian Decimetric Array (BDA)	Cachoeira Paulista, São Paulo, Brazil (22°41′19″S 45°00′20″W)	1.2–6.0 GHz	38-element radio telescope interferometer working in the frequency range of 1.2–6.0 GHz. The final baseline will be 2.27 km in the east–west and 1.17 km in the South directions, respectively. This instrument will obtain radio images from the sun with a spatial resolution ≈4x6 arc seconds.
Cosmic Background Imager (CBI)	Llano de Chajnantor Observatory, Atacama Desert, Chile		13 dishes with 1 m diameter located at the Chajnantor plateau. Decommissioned in 2008.
Itapetinga Radio Observatory	Atibaia, São Paulo, Brazil		13.7 m telescope, operates in the K and Q bands, with cryogenic receivers
Jicamarca Radio Observatory (ROJ)	Lurigancho-Chosica, Lima Province, Peru	50 MHz	Main antenna is a cross-polarized square array composed of 18,432 half-wavelength dipoles. Research areas: Stable equatorial ionosphere, ionospheric field aligned irregularities, the dynamics of the equatorial neutral atmosphere and meteor physics.
Cosmology Large Angular Scale Surveyor (CLASS)	Llano de Chajnantor Observatory, Atacama Desert, Chile	30–240 GHz	Array of telescopes located on Cerro Toco and designed to measure the polarization of the CMB.
NANTEN2 Observatory (NANTEN2)	Llano de Chajnantor Observatory, Atacama Desert, Chile		4 m telescope located at Pampa La Bola.
Northeastern Space Radio Observatory	Eusébio, Brazil		14.2 m telescope
Argentine Institute of Radio Astronomy (IAR)	Pereyra Iraola Park, Berazategui, Buenos Aires Province, Argentina	1.4 GHz (21 cm)	Two 30 m single-dish antennas (A1, first light 1966; A2, built 1977) capable of daily pulsar and radio transient observations in the southern hemisphere at 1.4 GHz. Upgraded with new digital backends in 2019. Operated by CONICET and the National University of La Plata.
Polarization Emission of Millimeter Activity at the Sun	Complejo Astronomico El Leoncito (CASLEO), San Juan Province, Argentina	45 and 90 GHz	Full sun disk patrols with left- and right-hand circular polarization receivers.
Q/U Imaging Experiment (QUIET)	Llano de Chajnantor Observatory, Atacama Desert, Chile		Located at the Chajnantor plateau.
Solar Submillimeter Telescope (SST)	Complejo Astronomico El Leoncito (CASLEO), San Juan Province, Argentina	212 GHz and 405 GHz	1.5 m radome enclosed, single dish Cassegrain antenna, with a focal array (4 beams @ 212 GHz, 2 beams @ 405 GHz) of room temperature receivers.
Swedish-ESO Submillimetre Telescope (SEST)	La Silla Observatory, Atacama Desert, Chile		15 m telescope. Decommissioned in 2003
Espacio Lejano Station	Neuquén Province, Argentina	S/X/Ka, Delta Dor	35 m and 13.5 m Telescopes, Operated by Chinese Deep Space Network (CDSN)
Malargüe Station	Malargüe, Argentina		35 m telescope and deep space antenna, operated by ESTRACK

== Arctic Ocean ==
Name	Location	Frequency Range	Remarks
Greenland Telescope	Thule Air Base, Greenland		12 metre diameter Cassegrain telescope.
Eiscat Radio Telescope	Adventdalen, Svalbard		Studies of aurorae

== Atlantic Ocean ==
Name	Location	Frequency Range	Remarks
Very Small Array (VSA)	Observatorio del Teide, Canary Islands, Spain		Array of 14 dishes, with two larger source-subtraction dishes. Controlled remotely from UK.
Arecibo Telescope	Arecibo, Puerto Rico, US	8–3,000 MHz	305 m (1,001 ft) Second largest single dish spherical reflector radiotelescope in the world. Structural issues led to the decision to dismantle the structure. Before this could be done the instrument platform collapsed in December 2020.

== Indian Ocean ==
Name	Location	Frequency Range	Remarks
Mauritius Radio Telescope	Mauritius		

== Pacific Ocean ==
Name	Location	Frequency Range	Remarks
Caltech Submillimeter Observatory	Mauna Kea Observatory, Hawaii, US		10.4 m (34 ft) diameter submillimeter wavelength telescope, closed since 2015, due to be dismantled since 2019 to return the land to the natives.
James Clerk Maxwell Telescope	Mauna Kea Observatory, Hawaii, US	86, 230, and 345 GHz	15-meter submillimetre-wavelength telescope operated by the Joint Astronomy Centre
Submillimeter Array (SMA)	Mauna Kea Observatory, Hawaii, US	180–420 GHz	Operated jointly by the Smithsonian Astrophysical Observatory and the Academia Sinica Institute of Astronomy and Astrophysics of Taiwan.
Warkworth Radio Telescope	Warkworth Radio Observatory, Warkworth, New Zealand	1.2–21 GHz	12 metre fully steerable dish operated by IRASR, Auckland University of Technology
Warkworth 2 dish	Warkworth Radio Observatory, Warkworth, New Zealand	6–21 GHz	30 metre fully steerable dish operated by IRASR, AUT University
Transient Array Radio Telescope	Signal Hill, Dunedin, New Zealand	1.575 GHz	24-element aperture synthesis open source all-sky radio telescope, designed and developed by the University of Otago.

== Space-based ==
Name	Location	Frequency Range	Remarks
HALCA (Highly Advanced Laboratory for Communications and Astronomy)	Earth orbit with an apogee altitude of 21,400 km and a perigee altitude of 560 km.		Ceased operations 2005
Spektr-R or RadioAstron	10 meter radio telescope in a highly elliptical earth orbit. Launched July 2011.		Ceased operations 2019
Queqiao	Chinese Earth-Moon L_{2} orbiter		
Chang'e 4	Chinese base on far side of Moon		
Queqiao-2	Chinese lunar orbiter		
ROLSES-1 (Radiowave Observations on the Lunar Surface of the photo-Electron Sheath)	Lunar surface (Malapert A region), via Intuitive Machines Odysseus lander	5 kHz – 30 MHz	Four monopole stacer antennas; first radio telescope to operate on the lunar surface (February 2024). Collected data during cruise phase and two days on the surface, detecting terrestrial technosignatures and the low-frequency galactic background. Deployed by NASA.
LuSEE-Night (Lunar Surface Electromagnetics Experiment at Night)	Lunar far side, via Firefly Aerospace Blue Ghost 2 lander	0.1–50 MHz	Four monopole antennas in cross-configuration on a rotating platform; 108 kg launch mass. Designed to measure the radio sky through multiple lunar nights at frequencies below the ionospheric cutoff, targeting the cosmological 21-cm signal from the Dark Ages. Planned 18-month mission. Launch expected late 2025 or early 2026. Joint project of NASA and Department of Energy.

== Under construction or planned construction ==
Name	Location	Frequency Range	Remarks
Deep Synoptic Array	Nevada, United States	0.7–2.0 GHz	An array of 1650 6.15-meter dishes designed for sky surveys. Expected to start operation in 2029.
EAARO - East Anglian Astrophysical Research Organisation	Cambridgeshire, England	0–11 GHz	A scientific and educational charitable company currently constructing a Radio Observatory and Ground Station in Cambridgeshire
Large Latin American Millimeter Array (LLAMA)	Alto Chorrillos, near San Antonio de los Cobres, Salta, Argentina	45–900 GHz	12 m single dish, VLBI, in construction, expected to start operations in 2017
Qitai 110m Radio Telescope (QTT)	Xinjiang, China	0.3–117 GHz	Planned world's largest fully steerable single-dish radio telescope with a diameter of 110 meters. Operates at 300 MHz to 117 GHz. Construction of the telescope is planned to start in 2013 and completed within 10 years.
Square Kilometer Array (SKA-Phase1)	Carnarvon, South Africa	L-Band, X-Band, S-Band, UHF	Additional 128 dishes merged with MeerKAT, expected to be operational in 2022.
Baryon Acoustic Oscillations in Integrated Neutral Gas Observations (BINGO)	Aguiar, Paraíba, Brazil	980–1260 MHz	A crossed-dragone telescope with a 20 m main semi-axis primary reflector and a 17.8 m main semi-axis secondary reflector with 28 receivers, dedicated mainly to the detection of the Baryon Acoustic Oscillations through the 21 cm emission line.
THERMOpYlae	Phthiotis, Greece		32 metre (104 ft.) single dish communication antenna being converted into a radio telescope by the University of Thessaly and the Hellenic Open University.
Next Generation Very Large Array (ngVLA)	Plains of San Agustin, New Mexico, United States (core); additional stations across the US southwest, Hawaii, US Virgin Islands, and potentially Mexico and Canada	1.2–116 GHz	Planned successor to the Very Large Array. Will consist of 214 18 m dishes with baselines up to ~1000 km, 30 additional 18 m antennas on baselines up to 8860 km, and 19 6 m antennas in a short-baseline array. Approximately 10x the sensitivity of the VLA and ALMA. Operated by NRAO; early science expected ~2031, full operations ~2035. Estimated construction cost US$2–3.2 billion.
Fred Young Submillimeter Telescope (FYST)	Cerro Chajnantor, Atacama Desert, Chile	220–850 GHz	6 m crossed Dragone wide-field submillimeter telescope at 5,612 m altitude, formerly known as CCAT-prime. First-light instrument is Prime-Cam with seven frequency modules spanning 220–850 GHz. Half wavefront error ≤10.7 μm rms. Operated by the CCAT Observatory consortium led by Cornell University. First light expected ~2026.
Fortaleza VGOS Antenna	Rádio Observatório Espacial do Nordeste (ROEN), Eusébio, Ceará, Brazil	2–14 GHz (VGOS broadband)	12 m VLBI Global Observing System (VGOS) antenna, inaugurated October 2025. Replaces the existing 14.2 m S/X-band antenna at ROEN. Part of NASA's Space Geodesy Project and the global VGOS network. Improves Southern Hemisphere VLBI coverage for geodetic reference frame determination. Operated by INPE.
Canadian Hydrogen Observatory and Radio-transient Detector (CHORD)	Dominion Radio Astrophysical Observatory, Penticton, British Columbia, Canada; outrigger stations in northern California and central West Virginia	300–1500 MHz	512 high-precision 6 m composite dishes with ultra-wideband feeds covering 300-1500 MHz. Outrigger sites use cylinder designs derived from CHIME operating at 400-800 MHz. Designed for fast radio burst localization and hydrogen intensity mapping. First dish installed January 2025; test observations planned fall 2025; full capacity expected 2027. Operated by NRC and a consortium led by McGill University.

== Proposed telescopes ==
Name	Location	Frequency Range	Remarks
30m Sub-Millimeter Telescope (TSMT)	China		A 30m aperture sub-millimeter telescope (TSMT) with an active reflector has been proposed in China.
LOFAR Super Station (LSS)	Nançay, France	10–80 MHz	The Nancay radio astronomy observatory and associated laboratories are developing the concept of a "Super Station" for extending the LOFAR station now installed and operational in Nancay. The LOFAR Super Station (LSS) will increase the number of high sensitivity long baselines, provide short baselines and an alternate core, and be a large standalone instrument. It will operate in the low frequency band of LOFAR (30–80 MHz) and extend this range to lower frequencies.
Lunar Crater Radio Telescope (LCRT)	Moon	Below 30 MHz	The Lunar Crater Radio Telescope (LCRT) is a proposal by the NASA Institute for Advanced Concepts to create an ultra-long-wavelength (hereby wavelengths greater than 10 m – i.e., frequencies below 30 MHz) radio telescope inside a lunar crater on the far side of the Moon.
Square Kilometer Array (SKA-Phase2)	Australia, South Africa	0.05–30 GHz	Extension of SKA-Phase to approximately 2000 dishes. This array, if built, would be 50 times more sensitive and 10,000 times faster than any other radio telescope.
Hongmeng Project (DSL)	lunar orbit	0.1–30 MHz imaging, 0.1–120 MHz global spectrum	The Hongmeng project, also known as the Discovering Sky at the Longest wavelength (DSL) project is a Chinese space mission concept to create an ultra-long-wavelength radio telescope array on an orbit around the Moon.

== Gallery of big dishes ==
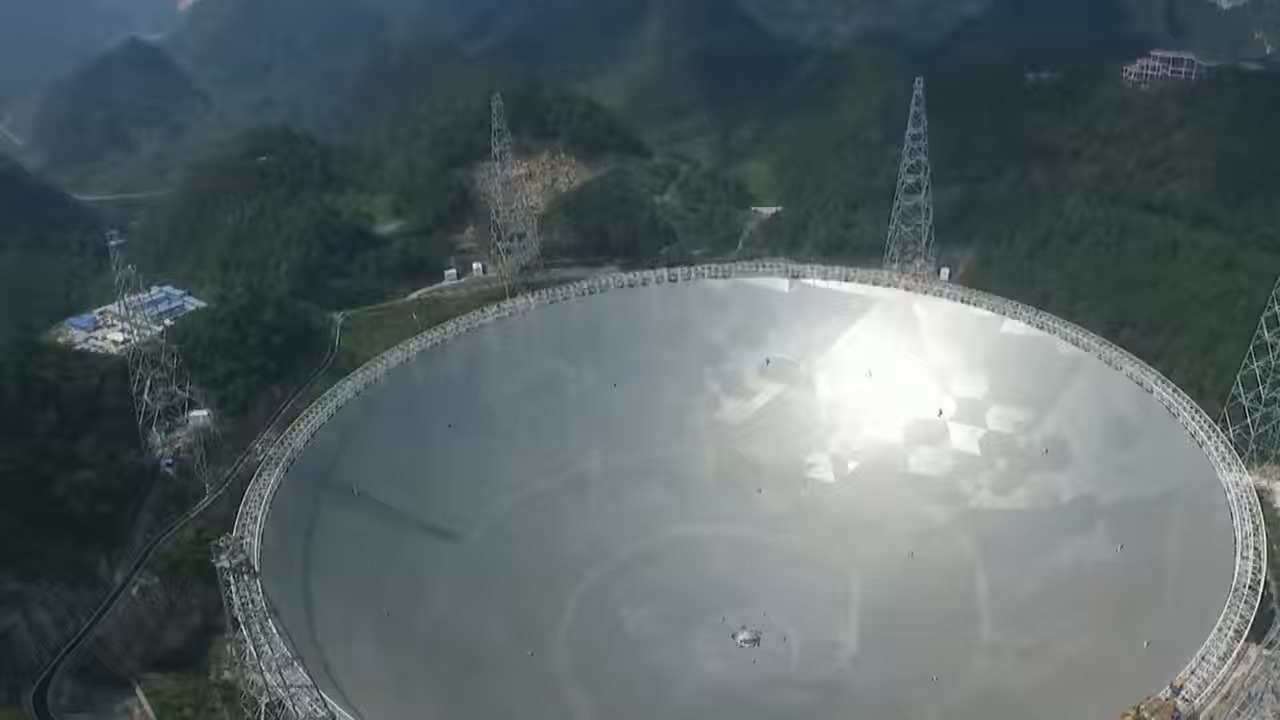
The 500 meter Five-hundred-meter Aperture Spherical Telescope (FAST), China (2016)

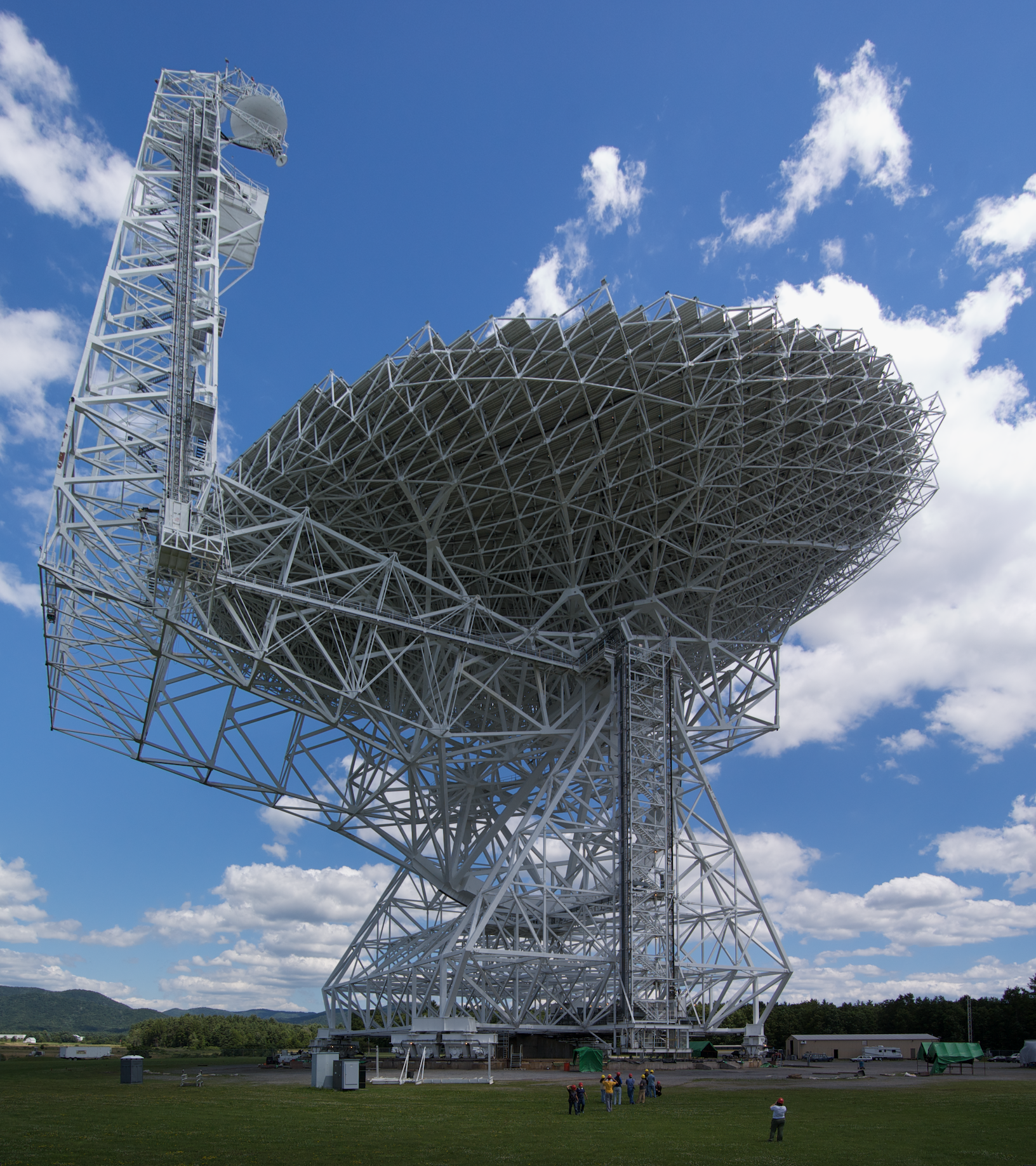
The 100 meter Green Bank Telescope, Green Bank, West Virginia, US, the largest fully steerable radio telescope dish (2002)

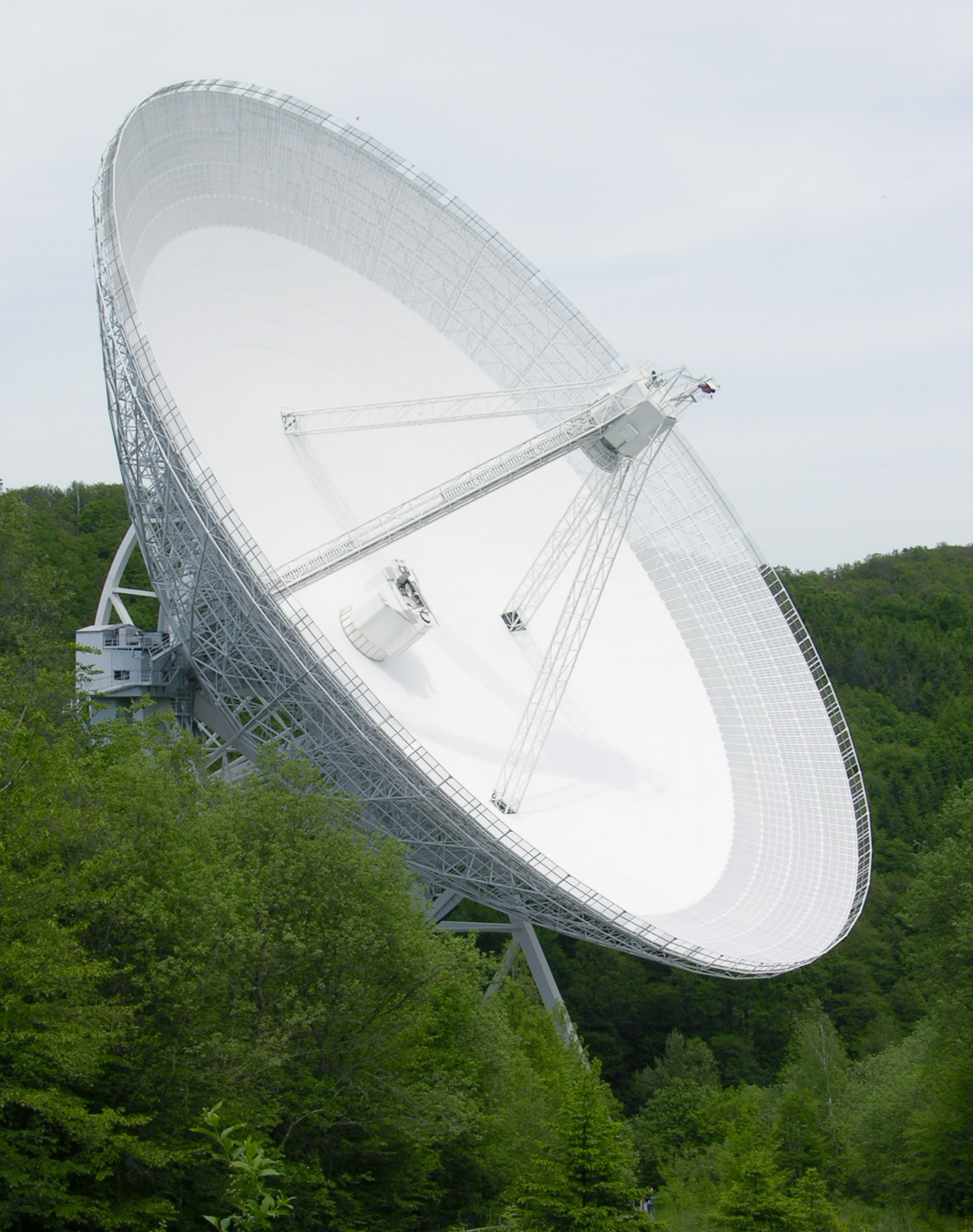
The 100 meter Effelsberg Radio Telescope, in Bad Münstereifel, Germany (1971)

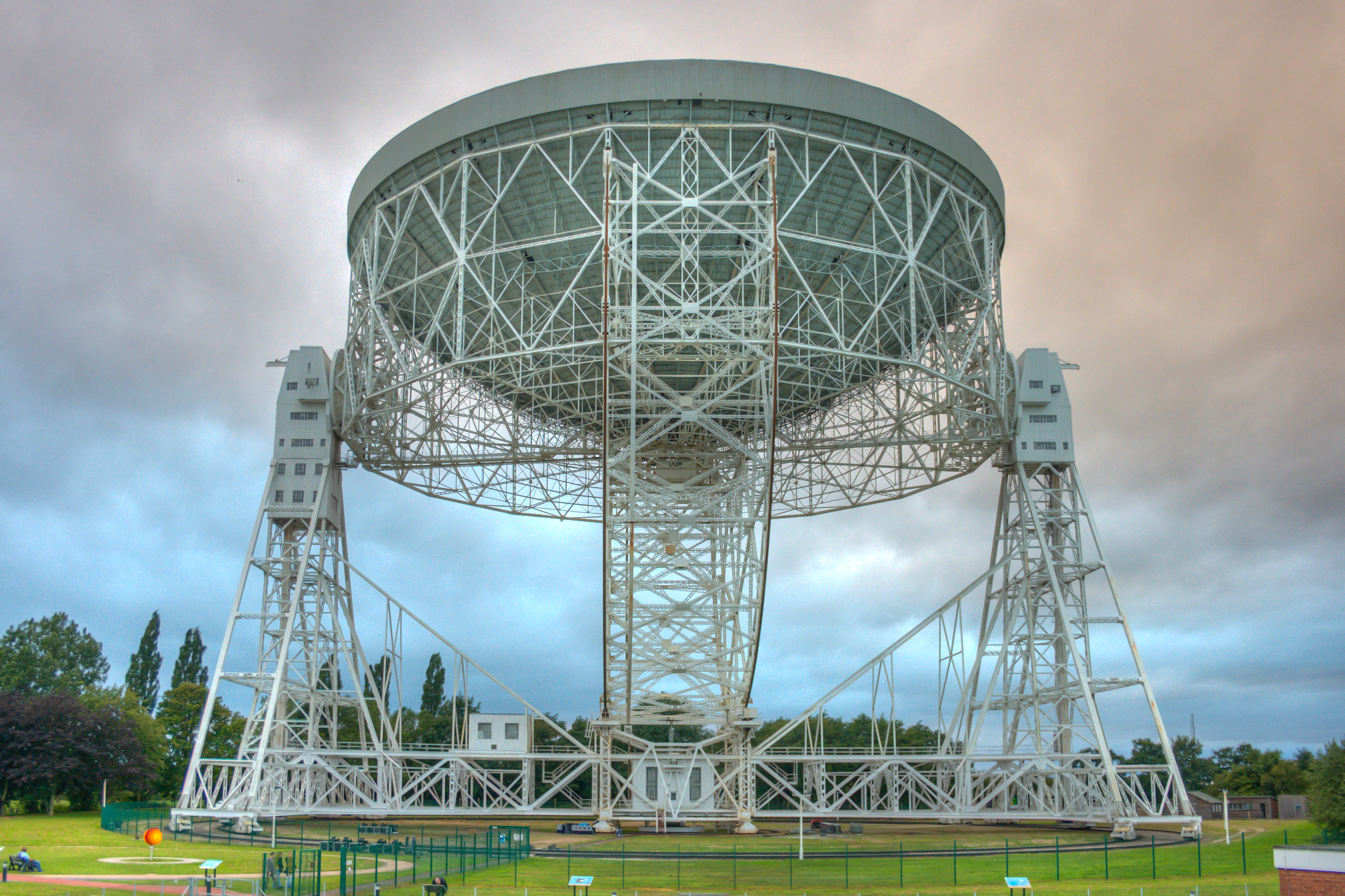
The 76 meter Lovell, Jodrell Bank Observatory, England (1957)

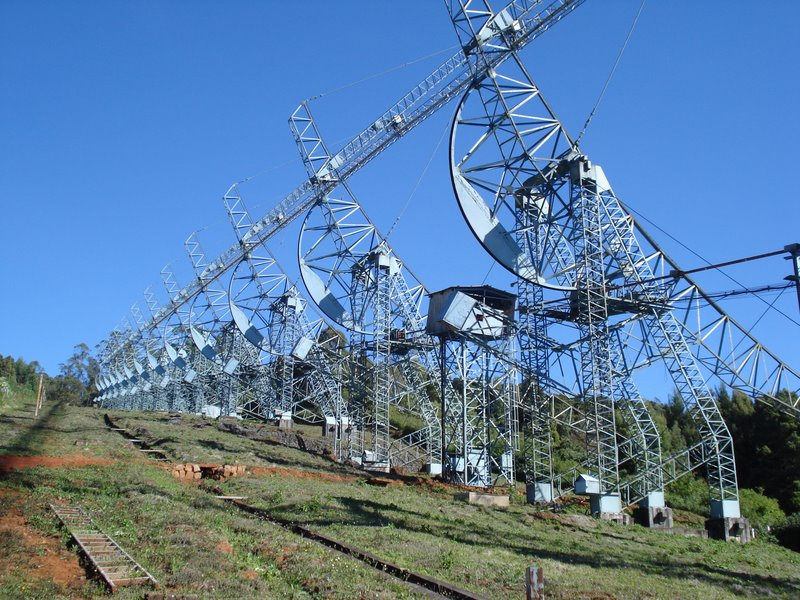
The 530-metre (1,740 ft) long and 30-metre (98 ft) tall cylindrical parabolic antenna at Ooty Radio Telescope Complex near Ooty, Tamil Nadu, India (Early 1970s)

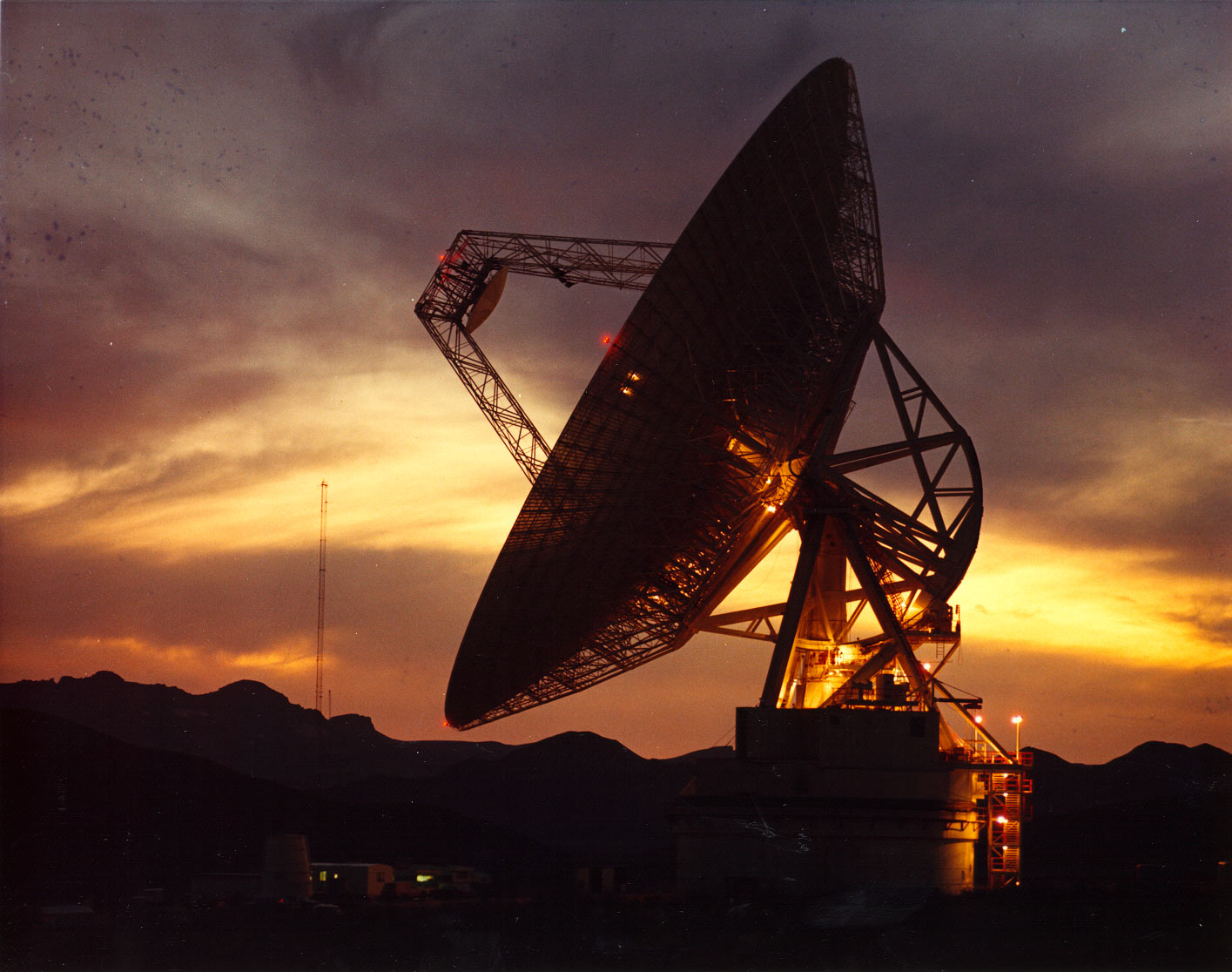
The 70 meter DSS 14 "Mars" antenna at Goldstone Deep Space Communications Complex, Mojave Desert, California, US (1958)

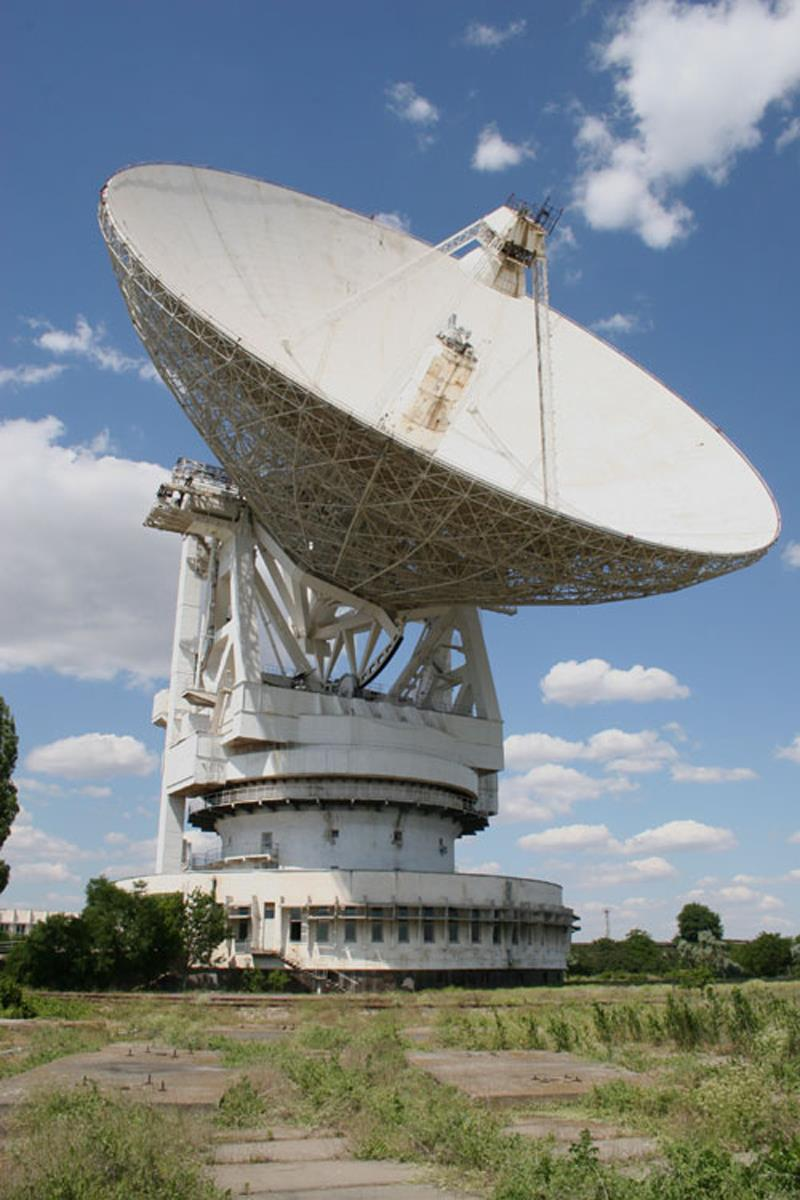
The 70 meter Yevpatoria RT-70, Crimea, first of three RT-70 in the former Soviet Union, (1978)

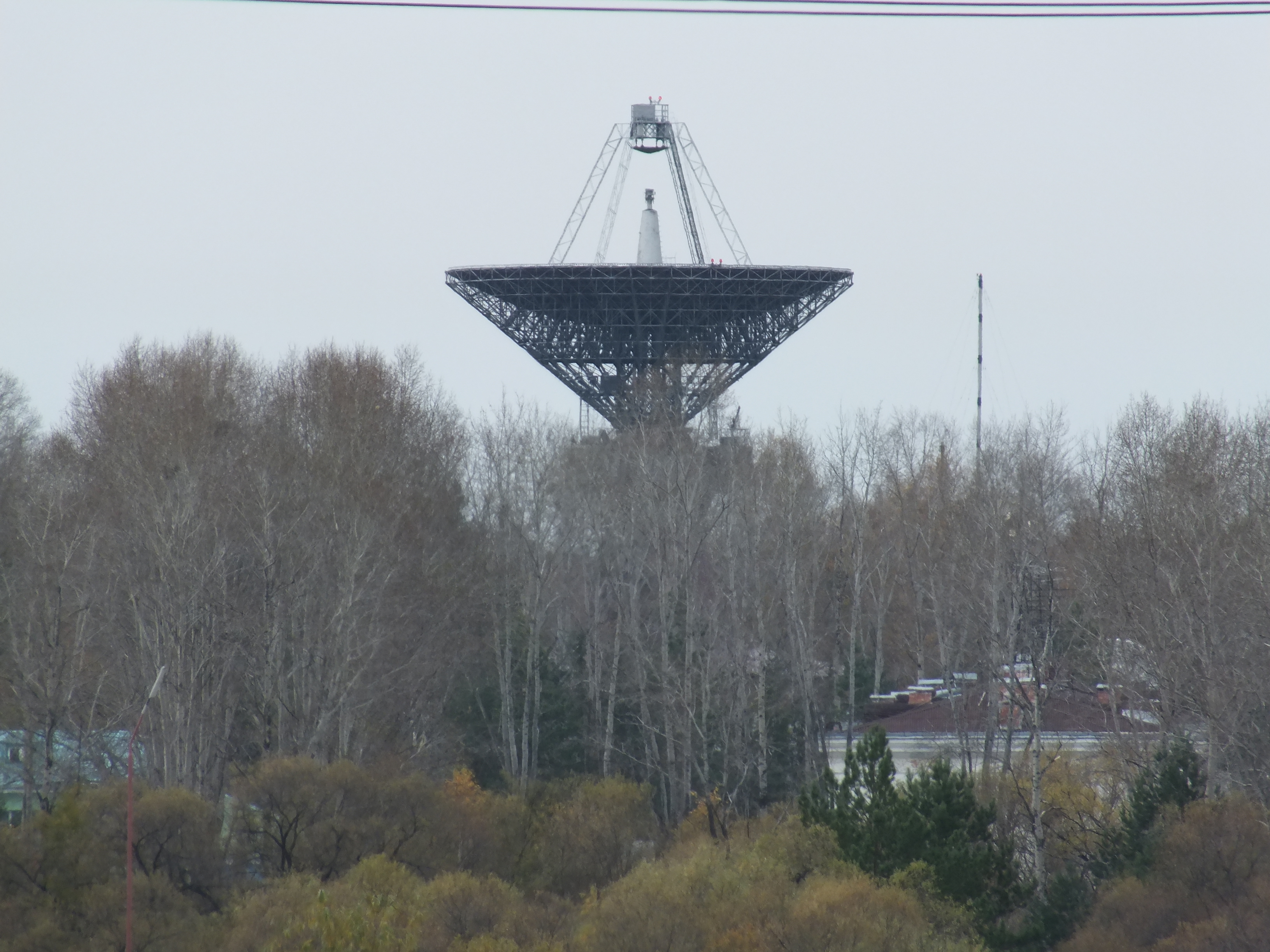
The 70 meter Galenki RT-70, Galenki, Russia, second of three RT-70 in the former Soviet Union, (1984)

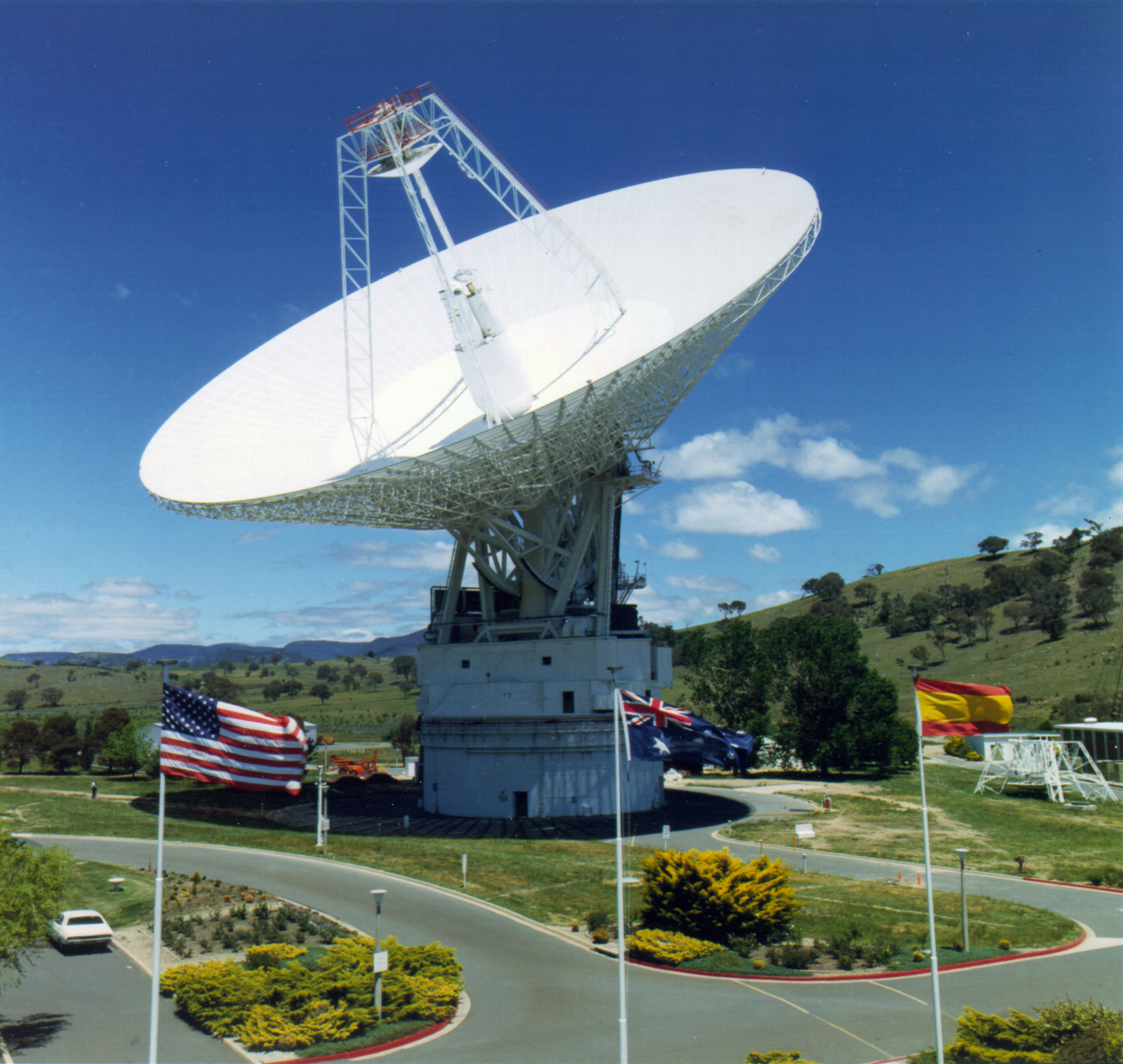
The 70 meter DSS-43 antenna at Canberra Deep Space Communication Complex, Canberra, Australia (1987)

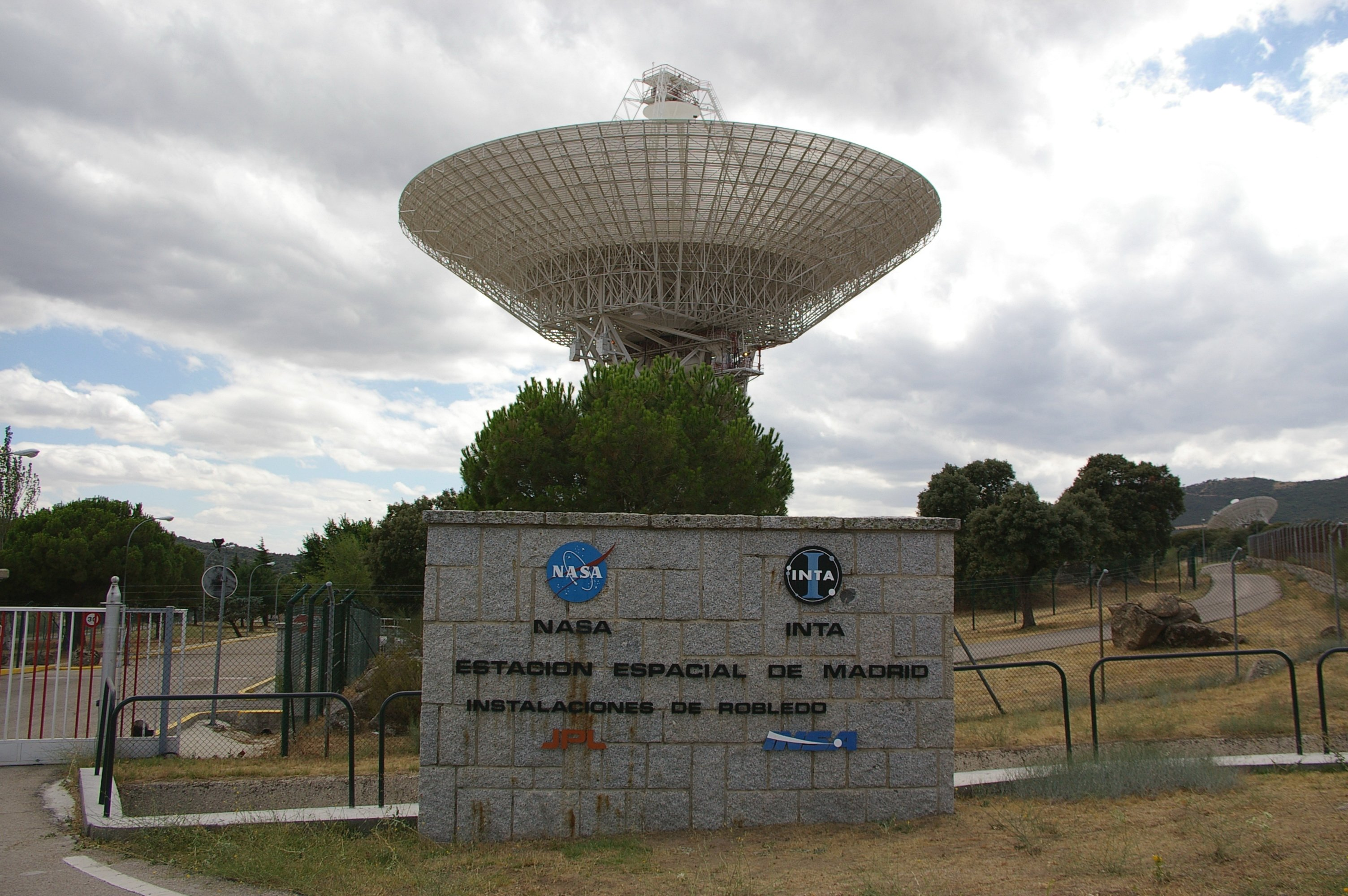
The 70 meter DSS-63 antenna at the Madrid Deep Space Communications Complex, near Madrid, Spain (late 1980s)

== See also ==
- Category:Radio telescopes
- List of astronomical observatories
- Lists of telescopes
- Radio telescope
