= National Astronomical Observatories of China =

China's national astronomical research institute

National Astronomical Observatories, CAS
- 中国科学院国家天文台; Zhōngguó Kēxuéyuàn Guójiā Tiānwéntái

Institute overview
- Formed: 2001; 25 years ago
- Headquarters: 20A Datun Road, Chaoyang District, Beijing, China 100101; 40.0043°N 116.3852°E
- Institute executives: Chang Jin, President; Liu Jifeng, Wang Hongyan, Zhao Gongbo, Vice President
- Parent institute: Chinese Academy of Sciences
- Website: www.nao.cas.cn

The National Astronomical Observatories, Chinese Academy of Sciences (NAOC, Chinese: 中国科学院国家天文台; pinyin: Zhōngguó Kēxuéyuàn Guójiā Tiānwéntái) is an astronomical research institute operated by the Chinese Academy of Sciences, along with Shanghai Astronomical Observatory, Purple Mountain Observatory and National Time Service Center.

== History and introduction ==
Founded on April 25, 2001, NAOC was formed through the merging of four Chinese Academy of Sciences (CAS) observatories, three CAS observing stations and one CAS research centre.

The Headquarters of the NAOC are situated in the northern Chaoyang District of Beijing on the site of the former Beijing Astronomical Observatory (BAO), and take responsibility for all matters relating to the former BAO.

Currently, NAOC has 7 astronomical research departments listed follows:

- Optical Astronomy Research Department (光学天文研究部)
- Radio Astronomy Research Department (射电天文研究部)
- Galactic Astronomy & Cosmology Research Department (星系宇宙学研究部)
- Moon & Deep Space Detection Research Department (月球与深空探测研究部)
- Space Science Research Department (空间科学研究部)
- Solar Astrophysics Research Department (太阳物理研究部)
- Applied Astronomy Research Department (应用天文研究部)

Besides apparatus like 2.16m optical telescope and 50m radio telescope, NAOC also operates the Large Sky Area Multi-Object Fiber Spectroscopy Telescope (LAMOST) and one of the largest radio observatory, the Five-hundred-meter Aperture Spherical radio Telescope (FAST). The future China Space Station Telescope (CSST) will also be operated by NAOC.

Editorial departments of Research in Astronomy and Astrophysics (RAA) and China National Astronomy (中国国家天文) are located in NAOC.

== Subordinate units ==
=== Direct subordinate units ===
NAOC currently have 4 direct subordinate units, with 2 astronomical observatory, 1 artificial satellite observing station and 1 astronomical instrument developing institute.

- Yunnan Observatories, CAS, Yunnan Province
- Xinjiang Astronomical Observatory, CAS, Xinjiang Uygur Autonomous Region
- Changchun Observatory, National Astronomical Observatories, CAS, Jilin Province
- Nanjing Institute of Astronomical Optics & Technologies, CAS, Jiangsu Province

=== Observing stations ===
- Xinglong Observing Station, NAOC
- Huairou Solar Observing Station, NAOC
- Miyun Observing Station, NAOC
- Ming'antu Observing Station, NAOC
- Wulasitai Observing Station, NAOC
- South America Observing Station, NAOC

== Research highlights ==
=== Fast radio bursts (FRBs) ===
In 2019, FAST observation to fast radio burst (FRB) event FRB180301 reveals that the origin of FRBs should be inside the magnetosphere of designated object. In 2020, another FRB event FRB200428, which was later confirmed to be originated from magnetar SGR J1935+2154, was observed in detail by FAST team. Research suggests that a low correlation between FRBs and magnetar X-ray burst.

=== Dark matter halo ===
In 2020, NAOC and its collaborators performed a numerical simulation to dark matter halo between galaxies. This GADGET-4 simulation, with a dynamic range over 30 magnitudes, plotted a clear structure of dark matter haloes with mass ranging from earth-size to cosmological scale. The simulation provides a detailed universe structure under L-CDM model.

== International collaboration ==
NAOC took part in a wide range of International collaborations, include Square Kilometre Array (SKA), Thirty Meter Telescope (TMT), Herschel Space Observatory, and Beijing-Arizona Sky Survey (BASS), etc. Meanwhile, several NAOC developing projects are also international collaborated, including FAST.

NAOC also started cooperation with futuristic projects like Einstein Probe (EP), CSST, etc.

In 2023, NAOC signed an agreement with the Pontifical Catholic University of Chile to collaborate on a space observatory in the northern Atacama Desert. The agreement has raised security concerns with the U.S. government.

== See also ==
- List of astronomical observatories
- Shanghai Astronomical Observatory (中国科学院上海天文台)
- Purple Mountain Observatory (中国科学院紫金山天文台)
- National Time Service Center (中国科学院国家授时中心), former Shaanxi Astronomical Observatory
- Tianlai experiment
