= Huairou Reservoir =

- Location within Beijing
- Coordinates: 40°18′42″N 116°36′19″E
- Type: reservoir
- Basin countries: China

The Huairou Reservoir is a reservoir in Huairou District, Beijing, China. It is located about 60 km north of central Beijing. It is the site of the Huairou Solar Observing Station.
