= Northeastern Space Radio Observatory =

Space radio dish antenna

- Location(s): Eusébio, Ceará, Brazil
- Coordinates: 3°52′41″S 38°25′33″W
- Diameter: 14.2 m (46 ft 7 in)
- Website: www.roen.inpe.br/index_e.htm
- Location of Northeastern Space Radio Observatory

The Northeastern Space Radio Observatory (Portuguese: Rádio-Observatório Espacial do Nordeste - ROEN) is a 14.2 m (47 ft) radio dish antenna located in the municipality of Eusébio in the state of Ceará, Brazil, approximately 20 kilometres (12 mi) south of Fortaleza. The facility is owned by the National Institute for Space Research (INPE) and managed by the Center of Radio Astronomy and Astrophysics at Universidade Presbiteriana Mackenzie (CRAAM). It was initially funded by several by Brazilian institutions and the United States National Oceanic Atmospheric Administration (NOAA). It has been operating since 1993 and is used primarily for geodetic very long baseline interferometry (VLBI).

== See also ==
- Itapetinga Radio Observatory
- List of astronomical observatories
