= Huairou Solar Observing Station =

Solar observatory in Huairou, Beijing

Coordinates: 40°18′57″N 116°35′40″E

The Huairou Solar Observing Station is a solar observatory in China. It is situated on the north bank of the Huairou Reservoir, in Huairou District, Beijing, about 60 km north of central Beijing. There are two telescopes. It is operated by the National Astronomical Observatory of China, part of the Chinese Academy of Sciences.

== See also ==
- List of astronomical observatories
