= Research in Astronomy and Astrophysics =

- Discipline: Astronomy, astrophysics
- Language: English
- Edited by: Jingxiu Wang, Liang Gao

Publication details
- Former names: Acta Astrophysica Sinica, Chinese Journal of Astronomy and Astrophysics
- History: 1981–present
- Publisher: IOP Publishing, on behalf of the National Astronomical Observatory of China and the Chinese Astronomical Society
- Frequency: Monthly
- Impact factor: 1.8 (2023)

Standard abbreviations
- ISO 4: Res. Astron. Astrophys.

Indexing
- ISSN: 1674-4527
- LCCN: 2009242173
- OCLC no.: 430936171
- Acta Astrophysica Sinica
- ISSN: 0253-2379

Links
- Journal homepage; Journal page at publisher's website; Online access; Online archive

Research in Astronomy and Astrophysics is a monthly peer-reviewed scientific journal covering all branches of astronomy and astrophysics. It was established in 1981 as Acta Astrophysica Sinica and published in Chinese. It was renamed Chinese Journal of Astronomy and Astrophysics in 2001, switching to publication in English and restarting volume numbering. It obtained its current name in 2009. The journal is published by IOP Publishing, on behalf of the National Astronomical Observatory of China and the Chinese Astronomical Society. The editor-in-chief is Jingxiu Wang (National Astronomical Observatory of China).

According to the Journal Citation Reports, the journal has a 2023 impact factor of 1.8.
