= Transient Array Radio Telescope =

Open-source imaging radio telescope

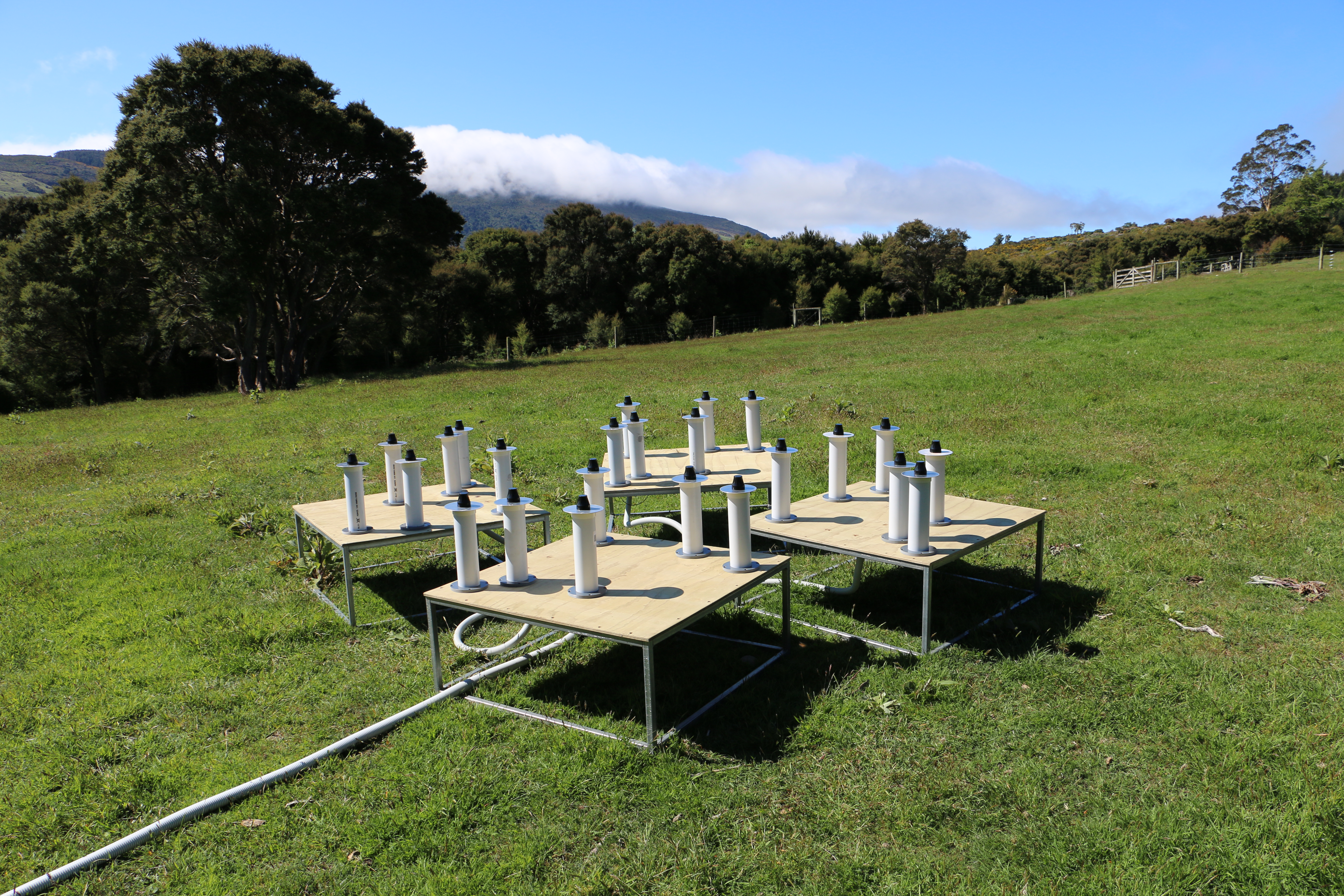
The Antenna Array from a TART telescope showing the four antenna tiles, each with six antennas. The antennas are the small black objects at the top of each tube.

An all-sky image from the TART telescope, with known sources circled in red. The northern horizon is at the top, and the western horizon on the left.

The Transient Array Radio Telescope (TART) is a low-cost open-source array radio telescope consisting of 24 all-sky GNSS receivers operating at the L1-band (1.575 GHz). TART was designed as an all-sky survey instrument for detecting radio bursts, as well as providing a test-bed for the development of new synthesis imaging and calibration algorithms. All of the telescope hardware including radio receivers, correlators and operating software are open source. A TART-2 radio-telescope can be built for approximately 1000 Euros, and the telescope antenna array requires 4m x 4m area for deployment.

The TART project is managed by the Electronics Research Foundation, a non-profit based in New Zealand.

== Design ==
All of the components of TART, from the hardware, FPGA firmware and the operation and imaging software are open source. released under the GPLv3 license. A TART radio telescope consists of four main sub-assemblies, the antenna array, RF Front End, radio Hub and basestation.

=== Antenna array ===
The antenna array consists of 24 antennas arranged on four identical 'tiles' with 6 antennas each. Each tile is a 1x1 meter square. The antennas used are low-cost, widely available commercial GPS active antennas.

More recent installations use multi-arm antenna arrays in either a three-arm 'Y' configuration, or a five-arm star configuration.

=== RF front end ===
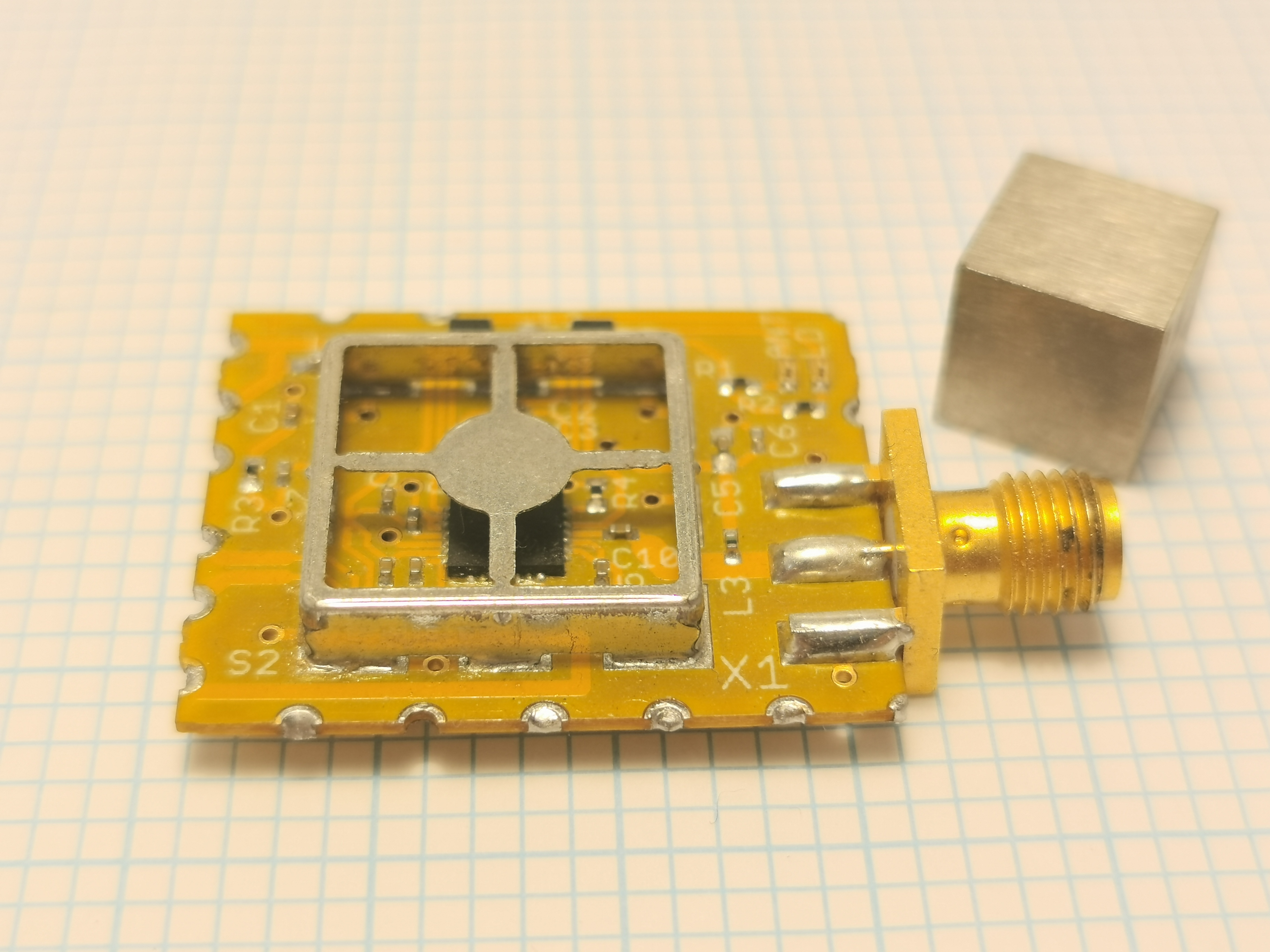
Radio front end module, showing the integrated MAX2769 receiver circuit.

The Radio Frequency (RF) front ends receive the radio signals from each antenna. The RF front ends take advantage of low-cost, widely available, and very sensitive integrated circuits developed for global positioning satellite receivers. The TART uses the MAX2769C Universal GNSS Receiver made by Maxim Integrated. This single integrated circuit includes all the elements required of a radio-telescope receiver; low-noise amplifier, local oscillator, mixer, filters and an ADC. Each RF front end generates a data-stream of digitized radio signals with 2.5 MHz bandwidth from the GPS L1 band (1.57542 GHz).

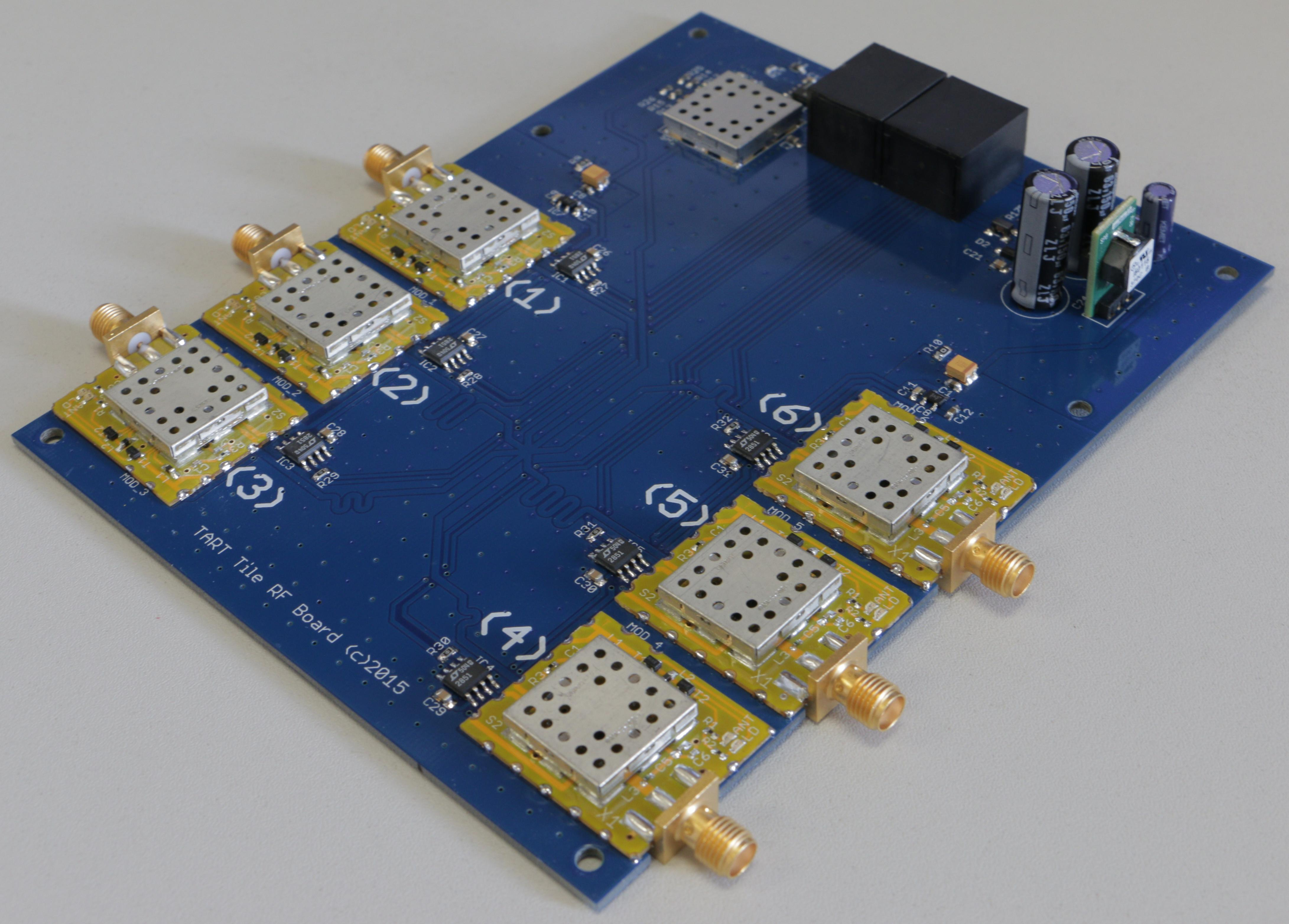
A single TART radio-hub module showing the six radio front ends.

=== Radio Hub ===
The TART contains four radio hubs. Each has six RF front end receivers and clock distribution circuitry. Each radio hub sends data to the basestation, and receives the master clock signal from the basestation, over two standard Cat 6 twisted-pair Ethernet cables.

=== Basestation ===
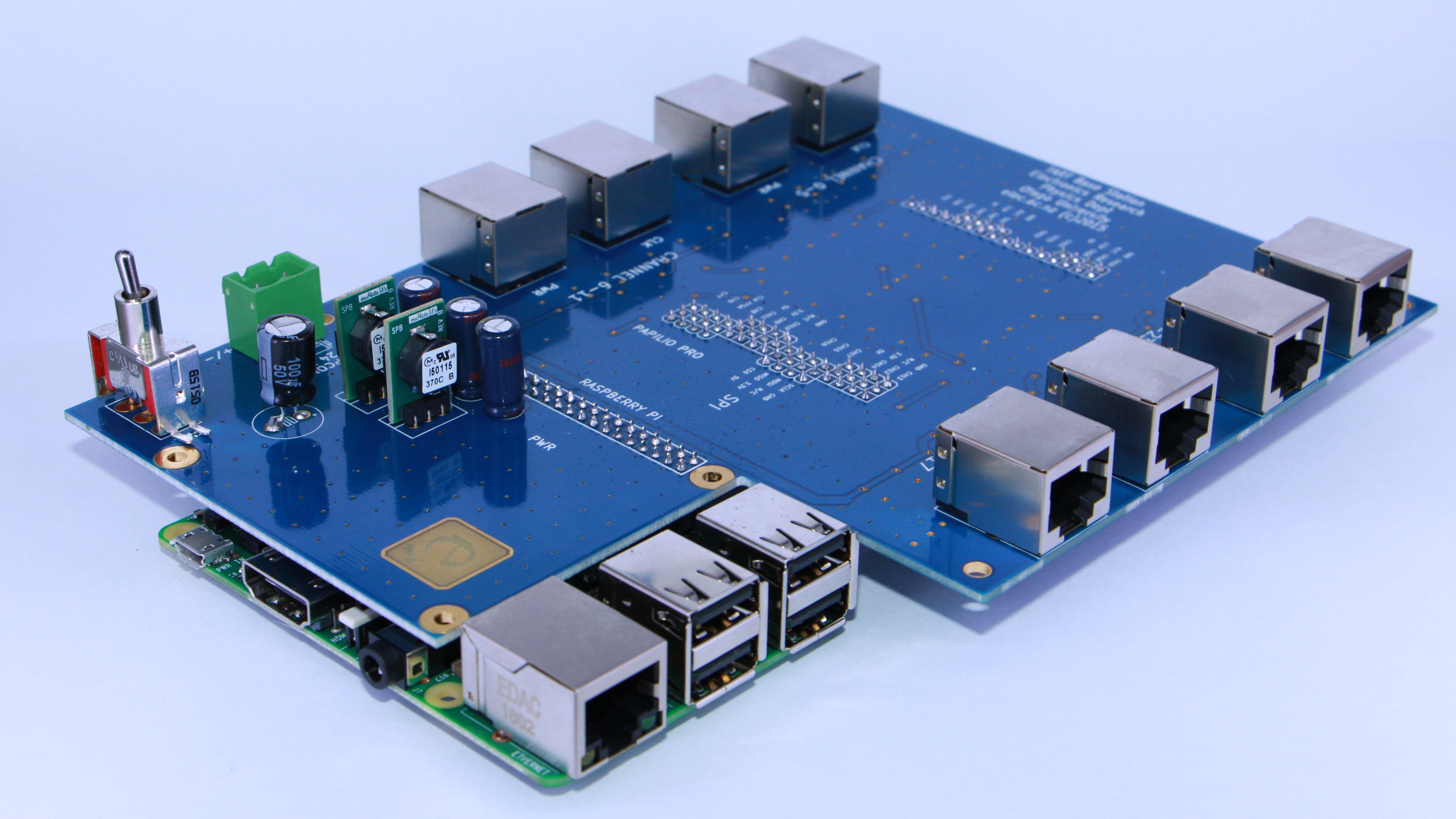
TART-2 basestation PCB showing the 8 Cat-6 Ethernet ports for communication with the radio hubs, and the Raspberry Pi host computer below.

The basestation is a single PCB with an attached Raspberry Pi computer, and Papilio Pro FPGA daughter board. The basestation provides the 16.3767 MHz Crystal Oscillator which is distributed to the four radio hubs to provide synchronous clocking to the RF front ends. The data is returned from the radios via each radio hub to the basestation, consisting of 24 parallel streams of 1-bit samples. An FPGA processes these samples, acting as a radio correlator. The 276 correlations are sent to the Raspberry Pi host via SPI, and made available over a RESTful API.

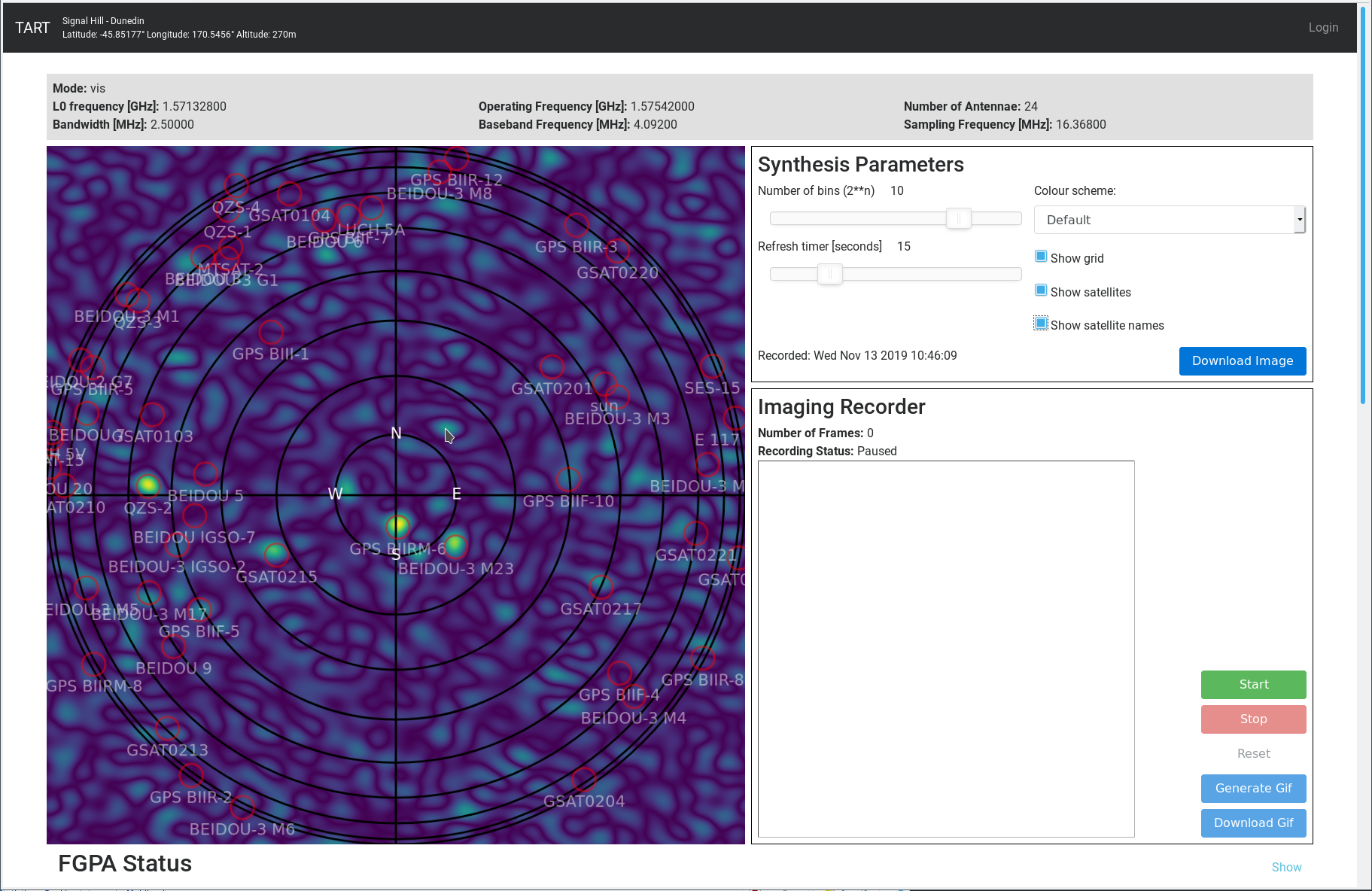
A screenshot of the console of a Transient Array Radio Telescope showing the live view of the radio sky in the L1-band

=== Indicative Budget ===
The component cost of a TART-2 telescope is approximately 1000 Euros. In addition a mounting for the antenna array is required. These can take several forms, with recent TART-2 telescopes using a multi-arm layout which allows for easy adjustment of antenna positions, these can cost approximately 1000 Euros depending on where parts are sourced.

=== Software ===
The TART telescope operating software is open-source and written in Python. It consists of several modules:

- A hardware driver that reads data from the telescope, via an SPI bus from the FPGA on the basestation.
- A RESTful API server that makes this data available via HTTP. This runs on the Raspberry Pi computer attached to the basestation.
- Software that performs aperture synthesis imaging based on the measurements.

==== Aperture synthesis imaging ====
The TART telescope can perform aperture-synthesis imaging of the whole sky in real-time. To do this the data from each of the 24 antennas is correlated with the data from every other antenna forming a complex interferometric visibility. There are 276 unique pairs of antennas, and therefore 276 unique complex visibility measurements. From these measurements, an image of the radio emission from the sky can be formed. This process is called aperture synthesis imaging.

In the TART, the imaging is normally done using a browser-based imaging pipeline. Three different pipelines have been written to date:

- The browser-based control panel for the telescope distributed as part of the TART archive can perform basic imaging. An example is available here .
- A lightweight imaging-only pipeline written by Max Scheel .
- A research project from Stellenbosch university written by Jason Jackson .

== Development ==
TART was developed by a team from the department of Physics at the University of Otago starting in 2013 with TART-1, and in July 2019, TART-3 is under development.

=== TART-1 ===
Development started in 2013 with TART-1, an M.Sc. project developing 6-element proof of concept radio-interferometer.

=== TART-2/2.1 ===
TART-1 was followed by TART-2 which was the focus of a Ph.D. research project. TART-2 consists of 24 elements and is capable of continuous all-sky imaging, with the 'first light' image being taken in August 2015. TART-2 was upgraded into TART-2.1 with reduced costs and improved clock stability. TART-2.1 started operation in 2018.

TART-2 includes real-time correlation of the radio data from every pair of antennas. This correlation is carried out in the FPGA. There are 276 pairs of antennas, leading to 276 complex visibilities being calculated which are used as inputs to the synthesis imaging process. These visibilities are made available via the RESTful API for live imaging, or downloaded for further analysis.

=== TART-3 ===
TART-3 started development in 2019. A TART-3 telescope will consist of 1-4 radio hubs each with 24 receivers. The maximum number of receivers in a single telescope increases to 96. TART-3 is designed to reduce construction costs, and simplify installation.TART-3 source code

== TART Installations ==
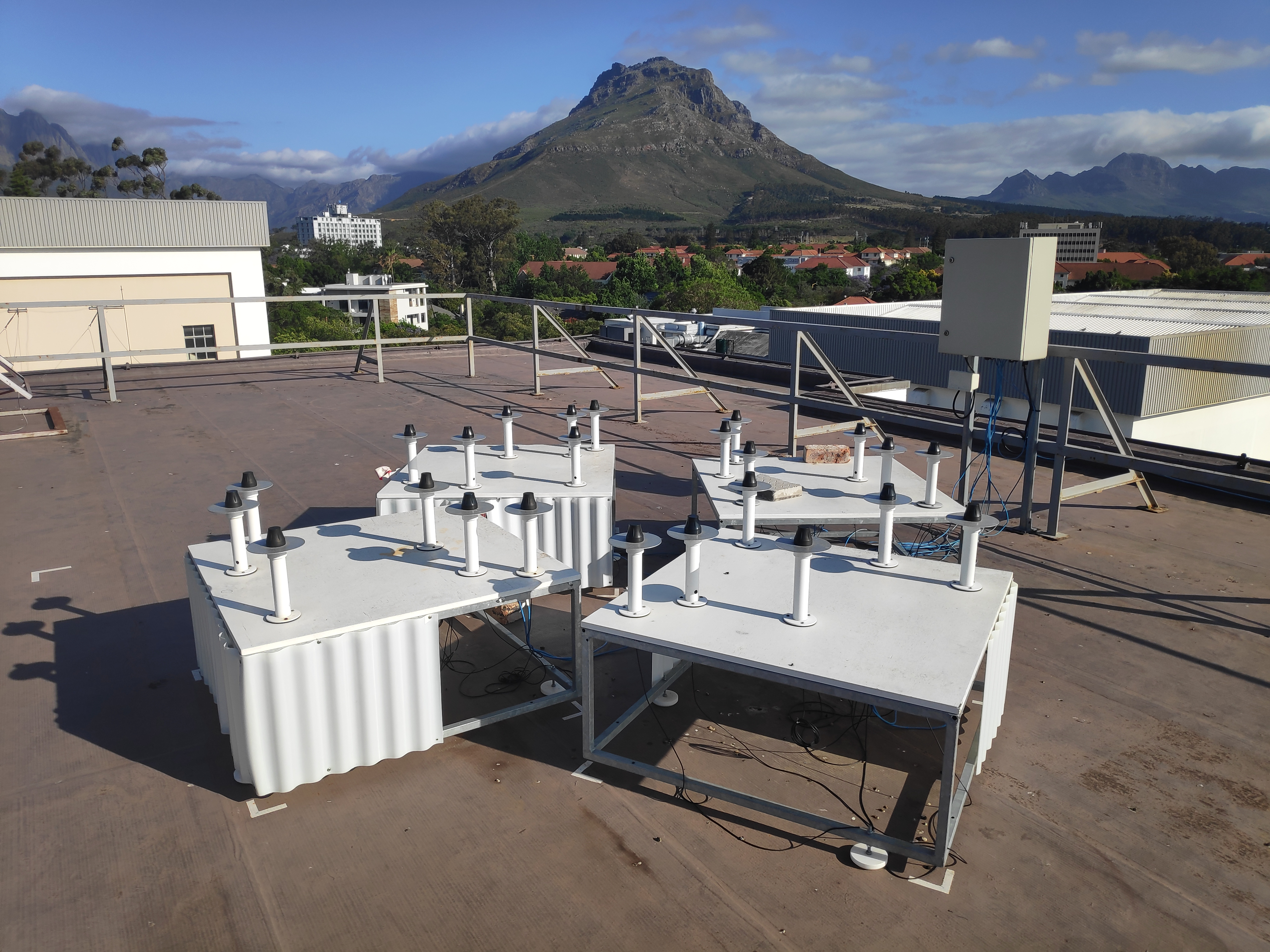
The TART-2 radio telescope located on the roof of the electrical engineering department at Stellenbosch University.

There are currently four operational TART telescopes, with seven more planned over 2025 as part of an initiative sponsored by the South African Radio Astronomy observatory.

The operational telescopes are shown in the table below:

Name	Location	Live URL	Version	Remarks
nz-dunedin	Signal Hill, Dunedin, New Zealand.45.85177°S 170.5456°E	Telescope Console	TART 3.0	The first TART deployment. Operated by the University of Otago.
mu-udm	Bel-air, Mauritius 20.2587508°S 57.7591989°E	Telescope Console	TART 2.1	Operated by Université des Mascareignes
TART-2-za	Stellenbosch, Stellenbosch, South Africa 33.9284639°S 18.8663558°E	N/A	TART 2.1	Operated by Stellenbosch University
TART-2-rhodes	Makhanda, Eastern Cape, South Africa, 33.319413°S 26.507688°E	N/A	TART 2.1	Operated by the Rhodes Centre for Radio Astronomy Techniques & Technologies at Rhodes University
