= Tianlai experiment =

Chinese radio astronomy experiment

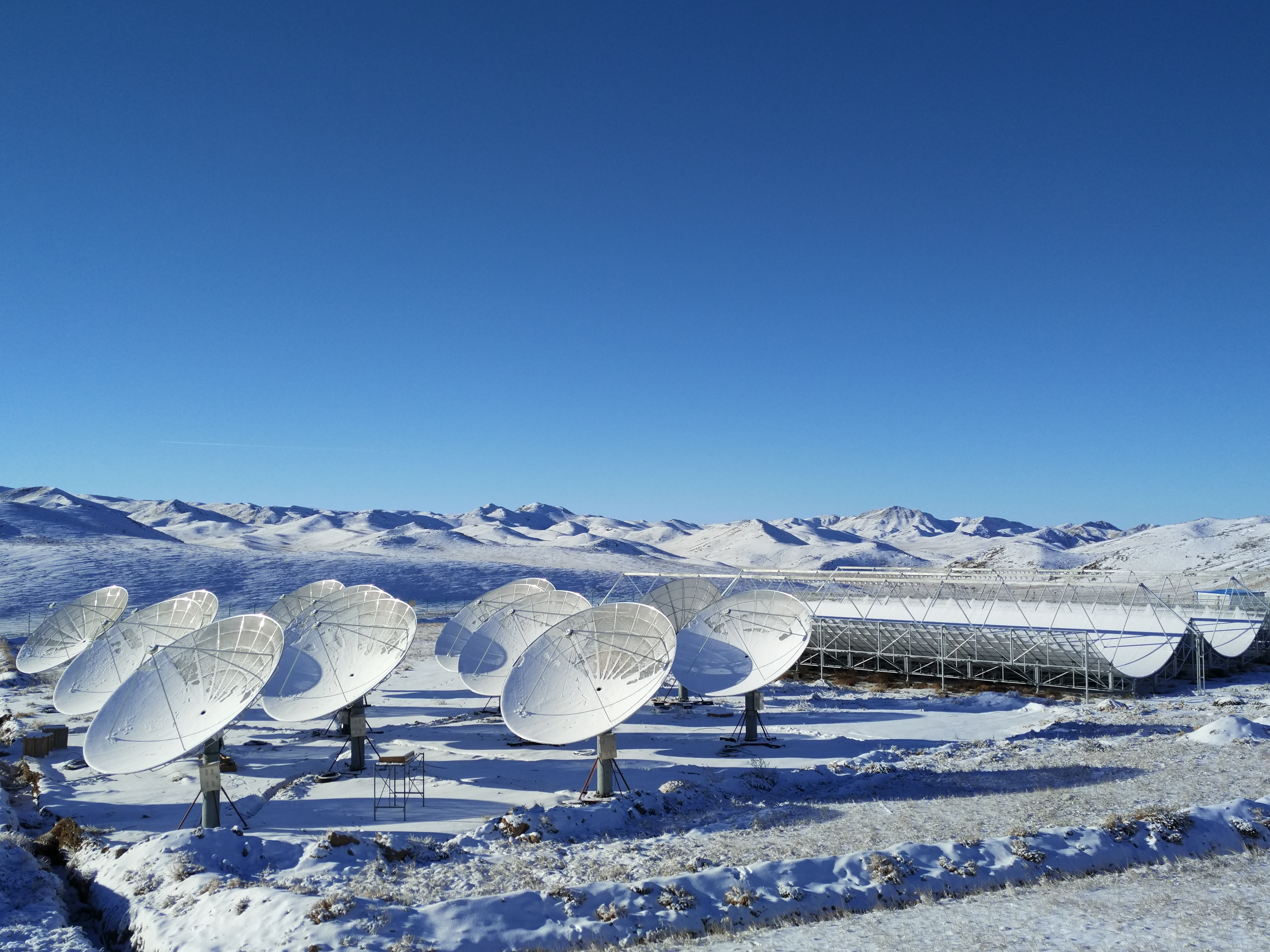
Tianlai Arrays

The Tianlai experiment (Chinese: 天籁) is a radio astronomy experiment run by the National Astronomical Observatories, Chinese Academy of Sciences (NAOC). Its aim is to develop the key techniques of intensity mapping observation for the redshifted 21cm line of neutral hydrogen, in order to probe the large-scale structure, and to detect and measure the dark energy using baryon acoustic oscillations (BAO). The experiment is currently at a pathfinder stage, two pathfinder interferometric imaging radio telescope arrays have been built for this experiment. These are the cylinder array and the dish array. In the full-scale stage, the experiment is expected to measure the large-scale structure, and use the BAO feature to detect the dark energy

== History ==
The "Key Technologies of Radio Detection of Dark Energy" research is funded in 2012. The NAOC team decided to choose this site in 2014, after surveying many sites in China. The first full observation took place in 2016. Between 2020 and 2022, new digital backends were installed on both the dish array and cylinder array, enable them to search for fast radio burst.

== Location ==
The Tianlai arrays are located at (91°48′ E, 44°09′ N). The signal collected by these arrays are transmitted via optical fiber to the station house, which is about 6 km away in the Hongliuxia village of the Balikun County, Xinjiang, China.

== Status and plan ==
Cylinder Array: This includes three adjacent, north-south oriented parabolic cylinder reflectors, with dimension of 15 meter wide and 40 meter long. However, only the central section of about 12.4 meters of each cylinder are used at present. A total of 96 dual polarization feed units are installed, with 31, 32 and 33 respectively on the three cylinders, all with the same total length, but with spacing of 41.33 cm, 40 cm, 38.75 cm respectively. This unequal spacing is designed to reduce grating lobes of the array

Dish Array: This includes 16 dishes of 6 meter aperture arranged in concentric circles.

The arrays are planned to carry out HI surveys and cross correlate with optical observations.

== International collaboration ==
The Tianlai international collaboration have members from the US, France, and India. It has a weekly online meeting, and an annual collaboration meeting

== Name ==
The word "Tianlai" literally means "heavenly sound" in Chinese. It is a concept which was first used by the ancient Chinese philosopher Zhuang Zhou, to mean a hidden rhythm of the nature. It is also often used to describe beautiful music. Here it refers to the acoustic oscillation of the Early Universe
