= The European Radio Astronomy Club =

Coordinates: 49°28′46″N 8°40′9.5″E

The European Radio Astronomy club (ERAC) is Europe's only group coordinating the work of radio astronomers to jointly use radio waves to study the universe at radio wavelengths. It was founded in 1995 by Peter Wright, who had the idea of writing a small newsletter to the then only 15-strong radio astronomy community in Europe, which were up to this date linked only by letters. Today E.R.A.C. has over 350 members in 19 different countries with a proportional membership of professionals and amateurs.

The European Radio Astronomy Club has its headquarters in Mannheim, Germany. The aim of the club to unite Europeans with a common interest in Radio Science. The main tool to do this is still a printed newsletter which goes out to all members. E.R.A.C. regularly holds an International Congress for Radio Astronomy which is attended by scientists from all over the world. Meeting in 1997, 2000, and 2003 were held at the Starkenburg Observatory in Heppenheim, before moving to the SRH University of Applied Science in Heidelberg in 2006.

In 1997, the director of the British Jodrell Bank Observatory met for the first time, the executive director of the SETI League. The result of this meeting was that SETI research was done for the very first time at Jodrell bank.

Institutes in Europe are thought to frown on amateurs with their backyard telescopes. This is in contrast with the situation in the United States; there, where amateurs had played such an important role in the birth of this new science, amateurs were tightly interwoven in all US radio astronomy work.

== The 21 cm Hydrogen Line ==
In 1995, E.R.A.C. introduced the UEK21 converter design which allowed anyone to have an inexpensive unit able to detect the hydrogen line. Together with a shortwave receiver to get the needed IF gain and frequency selection and a homemade parabolic antenna, it is possible for, say, a Young Scientist of the Year Project to build a radio telescope. Very soon, this unit was used in Europe also for SETI research as well for Project Argus from the SETI League.

Listening to Jupiter with the shortwave receiver needed for 21 cm, it is also possible to remove the UEK21 converter and use only the shortwave receiver connected to a simple dipole. If the frequency selected is above 18 MHz, it is possible when conditions are right to listen through the ionosphere. At lower frequencies, the ionosphere is opaque. Here, two targets are possible: the Sun with its solar flares or Jupiter, which is also a very strong radio source, together with the moon Io, which is a very powerful natural radio wave transmitter. When Jupiter, Io and the Earth are aligned, it is possible to hear this radio source very clearly.
