= Siberian Solar Radio Telescope =

Radio telescope

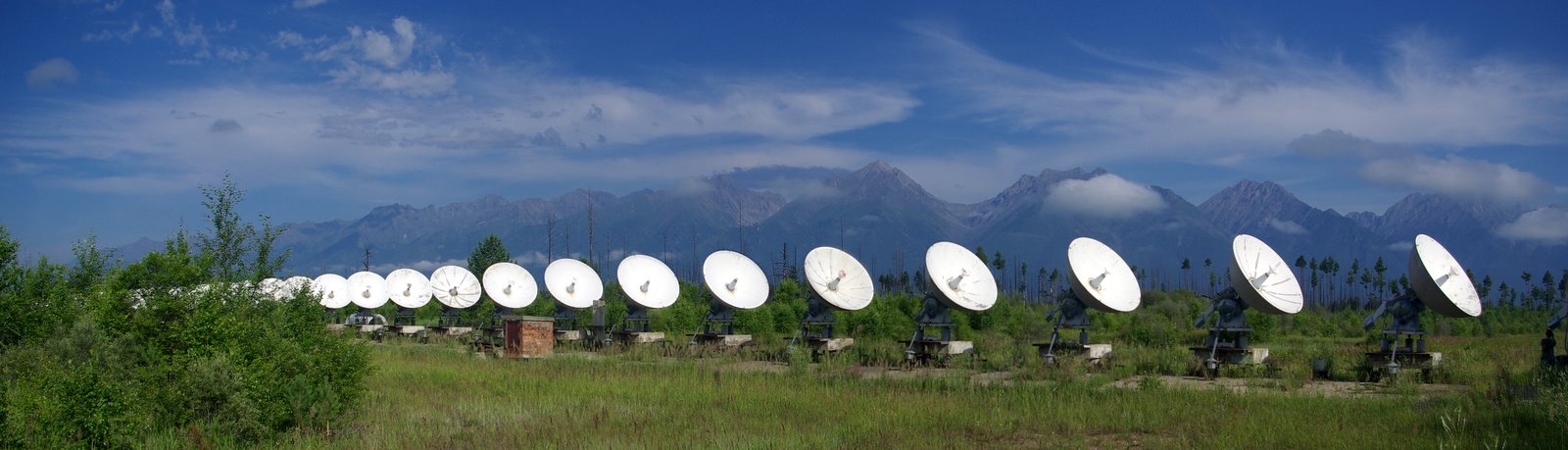
- Location(s): Russia
- Coordinates: 51°45′33″N 102°13′08″E
- Location of Siberian Solar Radio Telescope
- Related media on Commons

The Siberian Solar Radio Telescope (SSRT) is a radio telescope located in the Russian republic of Buryatia designed for solar observation.

== Radio telescope ==
It has been in operation since 1983. In 2017 it has been upgraded with the Siberian Radioheliograph.

It operates in the microwave range (5.7 GHz) where the processes occurring in the solar corona are accessible to observation over the entire solar disk. It is a crossed interferometer, consisting of two arrays of 128x128 parabolic antennas 2.5 meters in diameter each, spaced equidistantly at 4.9 meters and oriented in the E-W and N-S directions. It is located in a wooded valley separating two mountain ridges of the Eastern Sayan Mountains and Khamar-Daban, 220 km from Irkutsk, Russia.
