= Eusébio, Ceará =

Municipality in Ceará, Brazil

Eusébio
- Municipality
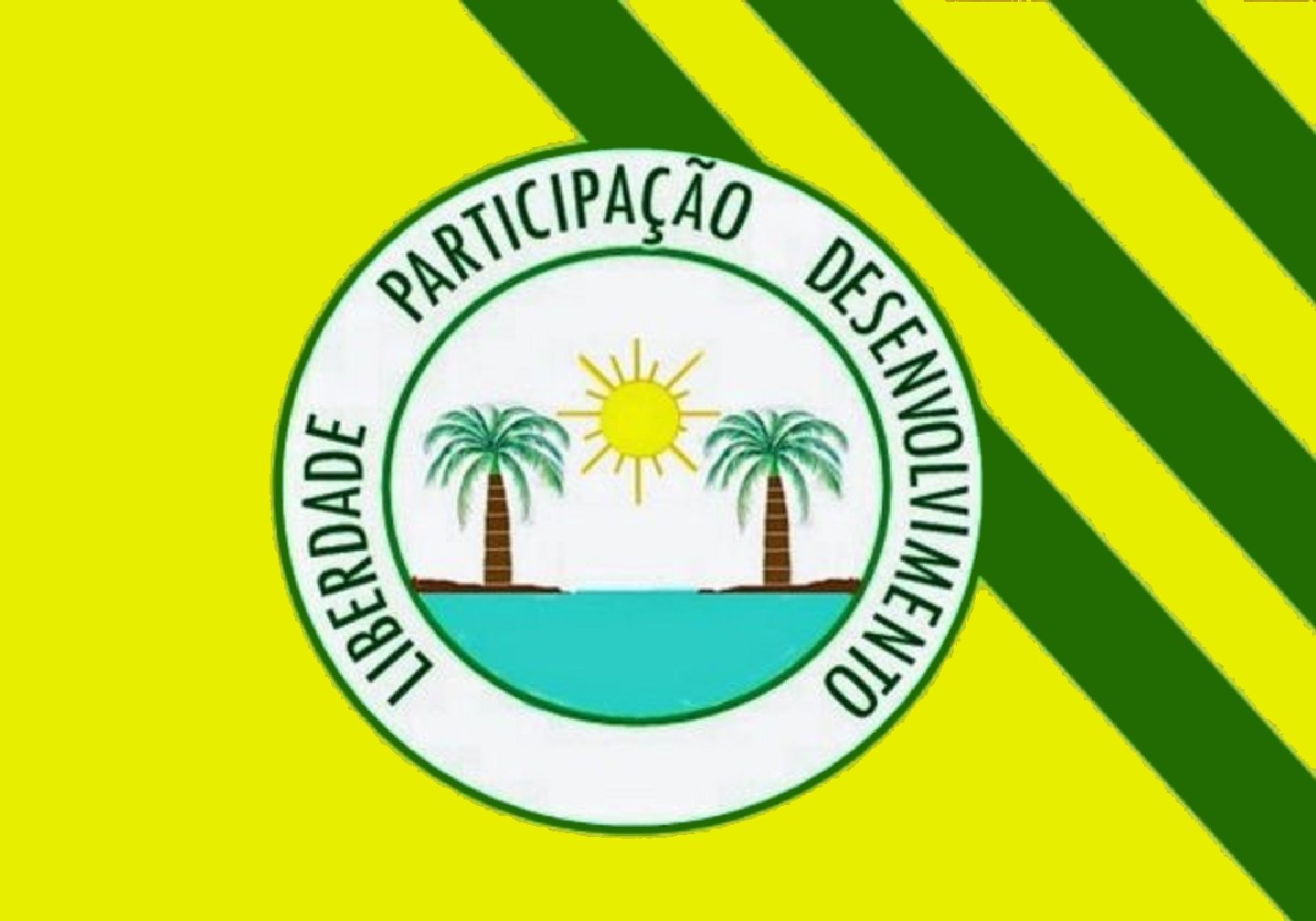
- Flag

- Location in Brazil
- Coordinates: 3°53′24″S 38°27′3″W
- Country: Brazil
- Region: Northeast
- State: Ceará

Area
  - Total: 79.0 km^{2} (30.5 sq mi)

Population (2020)
  - Total: 54,337
  - Density: 688/km^{2} (1,780/sq mi)
- Time zone: UTC−3 (BRT)

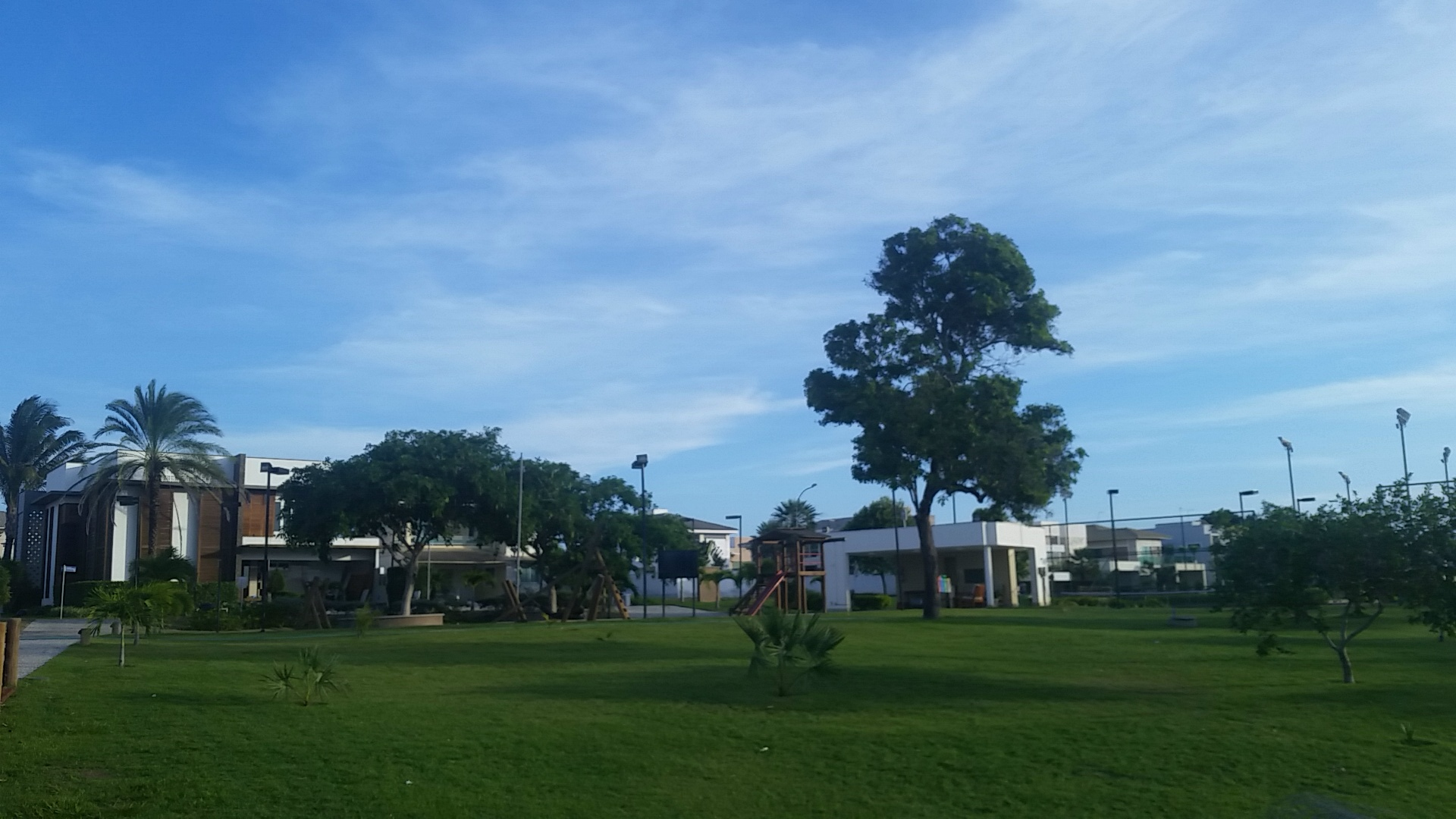

Eusébio is a Brazilian municipality in the state of Ceará, in the Northeast region of the country. Located in the Metropolitan Region of Fortaleza, 24 kilometers from the capital, it has 79 km^{2} of land area and an estimated population of 54,337 inhabitants, according to estimates by the Brazilian Institute of Geography and Statistics in 2020. The access route is CE-040.
