= Hanumant Shankar Sawant =

Radio astronomer

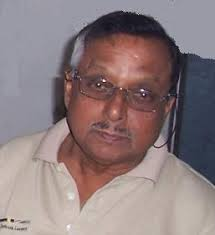
- Born: 13 August 1939; Pune, British India
- Died: 27 December 2025 (aged 86)
- Citizenship: Brazilian
- Education: Fergusson College
- Known for: Brazilian Decimetric Array (BDA)
- Scientific career
- Doctoral advisor: Rajaram Vishnu Bhonsle

Hanumant Shankar Sawant (13 August 1939 – 27 December 2025) was a radio astronomer and one of the pioneers of the Brazilian solar radio astronomy. He was the key scientist behind the concept, design, and installation of the Brazilian Decimetric Array (BDA). Under his leadership, an outstanding group in radio astrophysics was built at the National Institute for Space Research (INPE) in Brazil.

== Early life and education ==
Hanumant Sawant was born at Pune, India, in 1939. He received a BSc degree in Electronics and Communications Engineering from the University of Bombay in 1964, an MSc in Physics in 1971 from Ahmedabad University, and a PhD in Physical Sciences from the Physical Research Laboratory (PRL) in 1977. He was at the Department of Astronomy of the University of Maryland (1978–1979) and the Space Science Laboratory of the University of California, Berkeley, USA (1980–1981). In 1982, he became an Associate Researcher of the National Institute for Space Research (INPE) in Brazil. He became Project Director of the BDA in 2002 and retired from INPE in 2015.

== Major contributions ==
His main contributions involved observational and theoretical precursor studies of fine structures in solar noise storms at decametric frequencies and high-energy solar flares, in collaboration with leading scientists such as R.V. Bhonsle, S.K. Alurkar, S.S. Degaonkar, M. Kundu, P. Kaufmann and S.R. Kane. In 1982, he participated in the innovative investigation on the interplanetary effects of solar flares that occurred in 1979; in 1984, he published the results in partnership with S.R. Kane and A. Hewish, the Nobel Prize winner in physics in 1974. This was pioneering work in the scientific field that is now known as space weather.

He was the lead researcher for the development of several instruments in solar radio astronomy: ROI Millimeter Radiometer (18–23 GHz) at the Itapetinga Radio Observatory (Atibaia, SP), the Decimetric Solar Spectrometer (1.2-1.7 GHz), the Brazilian Solar Spectroscope (BSS) (1.0-2.5 GHz), and the Brazilian Decimetric Array (BDA), for which he served as General Coordinator from 2001.

== Personal life ==
Prof. Hanumant Sawant was married to Ratna Sawant and resided in São José dos Campos, state of São Paulo, Brazil. He had one daughter, Vidula Sawant, and one son, Abhijit Sawant (married to Sandra). He was the grandfather of Kyle, Enzo, and Enya. Sawant died on 27 December 2025.
