= Pierre Kaufmann Radio Observatory =

Pierre Kauffman Radio Observatory
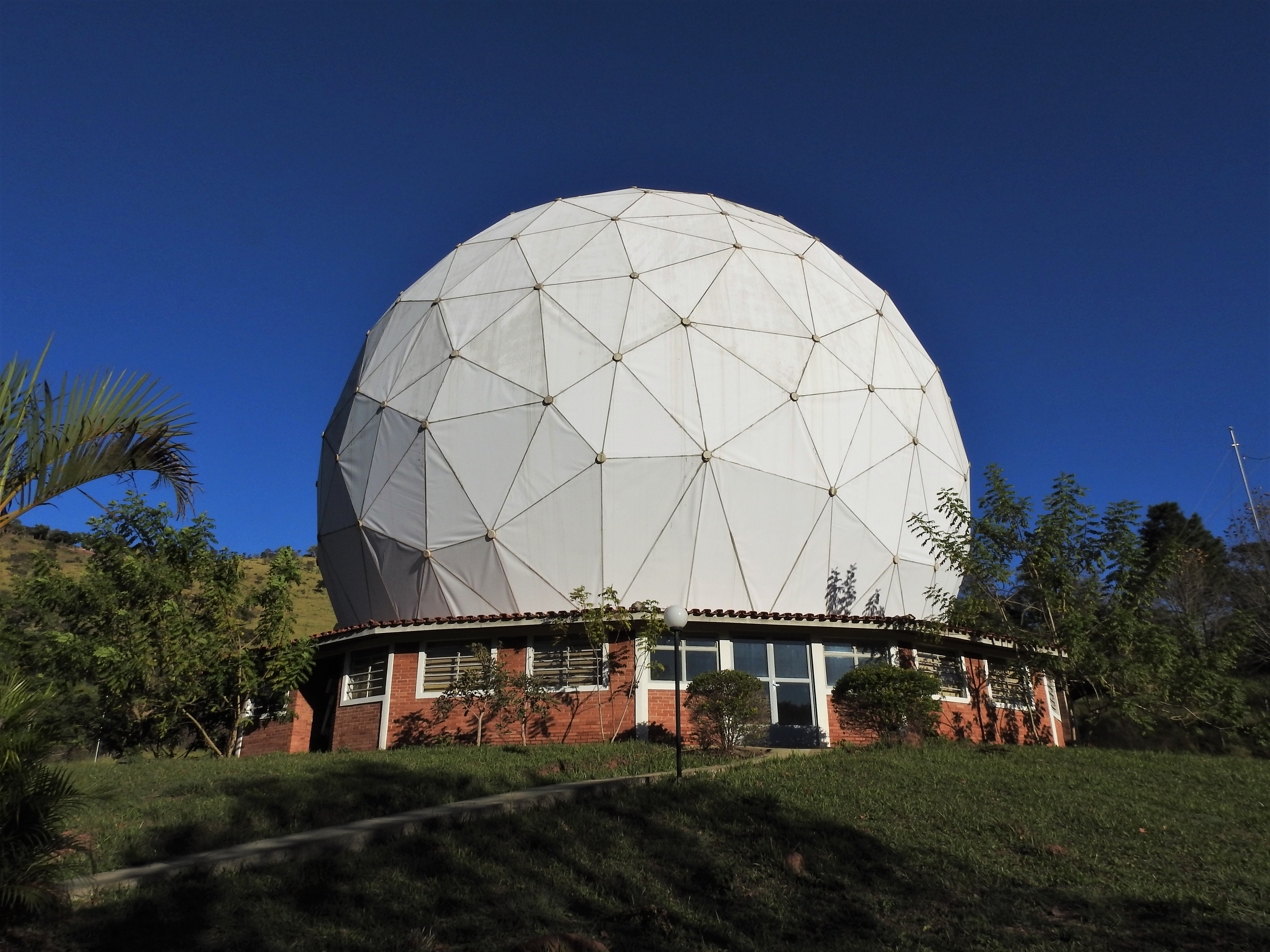
- Alternative names: ROI
- Named after: Pierre Kaufmann
- Organization: National Institute for Space Research
- Location: Atibaia, São Paulo, Brazil
- Coordinates: 23°11′07″S 46°33′30″W
- Altitude: 819 m (2,687 ft)
- Established: 1970
- Website: www.cea.inpe.br/roi/
- Telescopes: Itapetinga Radio Telescope; Solar Patrol Equipment; Solar Radio Polarimeter
- Location of Pierre Kaufmann Radio Observatory
- Related media on Commons

Pierre Kauffman Radio Observatory (Portuguese: Rádio Observatório Pierre Kauffman - ROPK), formerly known as the Itapetinga Radio Observatory (Portuguese: Rádio Observatório de Itapetinga - ROI), is a radio observatory located in the municipality of Atibaia in the state of São Paulo in Brazil. It is located approximately 7.5 km (4.7 mi) south of Atibaia and 40 km (25 mi) north of São Paulo. ROI was founded in 1970 by Universidade Presbiteriana Mackenzie (UPM). Control of the facility was passed to the National Institute for Space Research (INPE) in 1982. Today it is managed jointly by INPE, UPM, University do Vale do Paraíba (Univap), Universidade de São Paulo (USP), and Universidade Federal de Itajubá (UNIFEI). In addition to the telescopes, the observatory has living quarters for visiting scientists. ROI is located inside a small radio quiet zone. It was renamed in 2016 after Pierre Kauffman.

== Telescopes ==
- A 13.7 m (45 ft) dish antenna was completed in 1974. It is housed in a radome which was replaced in 1990. It observes in bands from 18 GHz to 26 GHz and 40 GHz to 50 GHz simultaneously. It is used for both astronomical and solar observations.
- The Solar Patrol Equipment (Portuguese: Equipamento de Patrulhamento Solar - SPUA) is an array of 1.5 m (4.9 ft) dish antennas on a common mount. It monitors the intensity and linear polarization of radio waves from the Sun at 12 GHz.
- The Solar Radio Polarimeter (Portuguese: Rádio Polarímetro Solar - RaPoSo) is a 1.5 m (4.9 ft) antenna with two low-noise receivers centered at 7 GHz. It monitors the intensity and circular polarization of radio waves from the Sun. It was originally located at UPM's defunct Umuarama Radio Observatory near Campos do Jordão and is the oldest telescope at ROI.

== See also ==
- Pico dos Dias Observatory
- Brazilian Decimetric Array
- List of astronomical observatories
- List of radio telescopes
