= Danilo Talanskas =

Danilo Talanskas (born 1950) is the managing director of Otis Elevator Company.

== Education and career ==
Talanskas got an undergraduate degree at the Mackenzie University in São Paulo. He then received an MBA from the Marriott School of Management at Brigham Young University. His parents immigrated from Lithuania to Brazil.

He worked for General Electric and Black and Decker. He also served as Brazilian chairman for Rockwell Automotive.

== Affiliations ==
Talanskas is a member of the Church of Jesus Christ of Latter-day Saints. He served as president of the São Paulo Brazil Santo Amaro Stake. From 1992 to 1995, he was a Regional Representative of the Twelve and from 1981 to 1984 was a mission president in Rio de Janeiro, Brazil.

In 2007, Talanskas was made a member of the Board of Local Managers advising the University of Pittsburgh on developing a program that would serve the needs of Brazilian MBA students.

In 2022, he became a member of the Sanford Royce Board of Advisors and contributor for CEO Worldwide.
