= Brazilian Decimetric Array =

Radio telescope interferometer based in Brazil

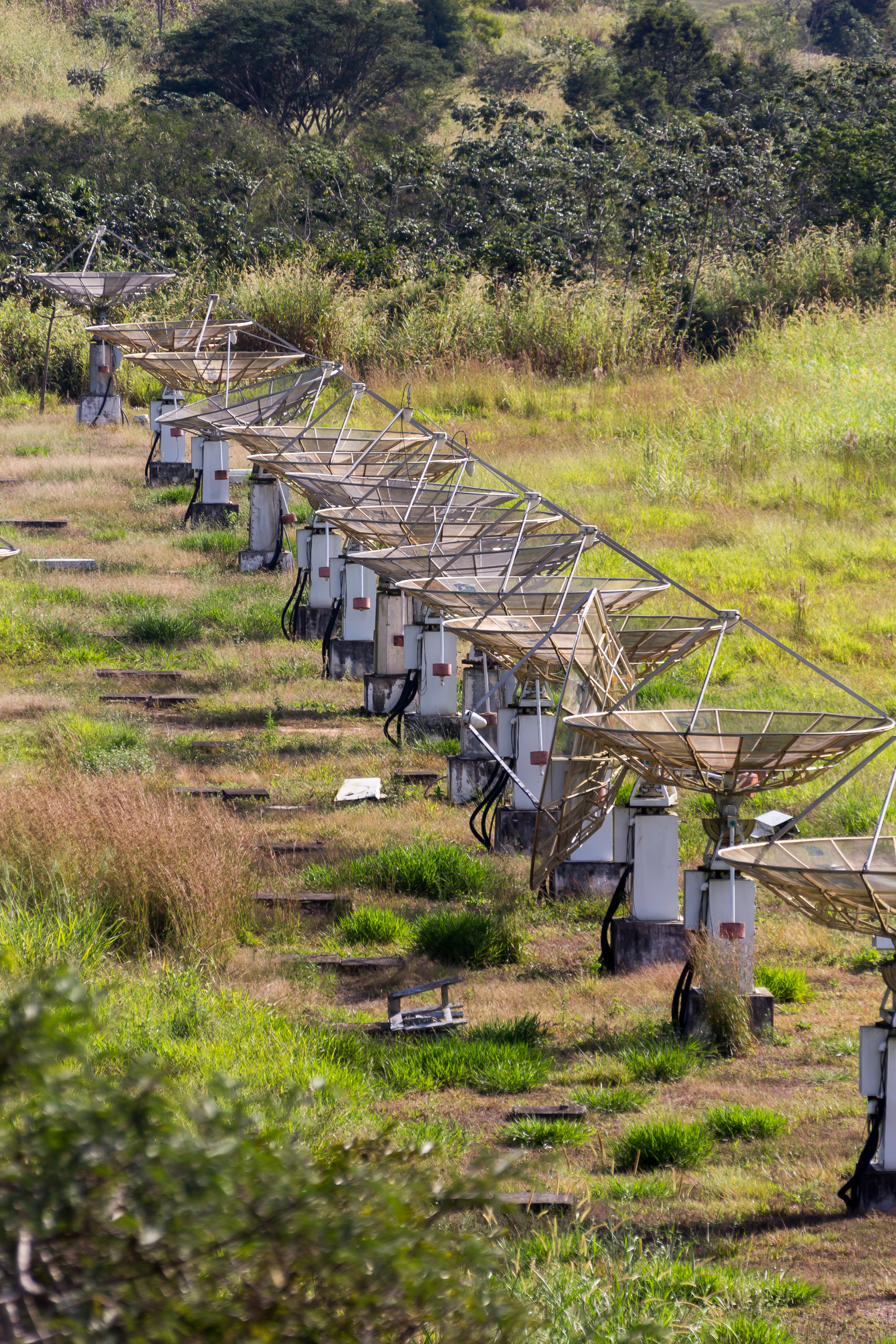
- Part of the BDA
- Location(s): Cachoeira Paulista, São Paulo, Brazil
- Coordinates: 22°41′19″S 45°00′20″W
- Altitude: 570 m (1,870 ft)
- Website: www.das.inpe.br/fmi/bda/
- Location of Brazilian Decimetric Array
- Related media on Commons

The Brazilian Decimetric Array (BDA) is a 26-element radio telescope interferometer located in the municipality of Cachoeira Paulista in the state of São Paulo, Brazil. It is capable of performing both solar and stellar observations in three bands: 1.2 - 1.7, 2.8 and 5.6 GHz. The BDA will obtain radio images from the sun with a spatial resolution ~4x6 arc seconds. The main project was conceived and driven by Dr. H. S. Sawant. Financially sponsored by FAPESP and INPE's Astrophysics Division.

The T-shaped BDA is being constructed in three phases. The first phase was a linear array of five 4.0 m (13.1 ft) parabolic antennas on alt-azimuth telescope mounts laid out on an east-west baseline of 216 m (709 ft). The dishes were originally installed at the National Institute for Space Research (INPE) campus in São José dos Campos in 2003 for testing. They were moved to Cachoeira Paulista in 2004. Beginning in 2010, the second phase was added. Nine antennas were placed on a new north-south baseline of 166 m (545 ft), and twelve antennas were added to the original east-west baseline, extending it to a total of 252 m (827 ft). A third phase yet to be built will increase the number of antennas to 38. The final baselines will be 2.27 km in the east-west and 1.17 km in the north-south directions respectively.

The BDA is the result of efforts of Brazilian scientists in collaboration with outstanding international astronomers, namely:

- Prof. Govind Swarup, National Centre for Radio Astrophysics of the Tata Institute of Fundamental Research, India,
- Prof. Kiyoto Shibasaki, Nobeyama Radio Heliograph, Japan,
- Dr. K. R. Subramanian, Indian Institute of Astrophysics, India,
- Dr. N. Gopalwasmy, GSFC-NASA, USA,
- Prof. W. J. Welch, University of Berkeley, USA, and
- Prof. D. E. Gary, from the New Jersey Institute of Technology, USA.

The BDA, when completed, will be open to the entire scientific community for use for both solar and non-solar observations and studies of space weather phenomena.

== See also ==
- Itapetinga Radio Observatory
- List of astronomical observatories
- List of radio telescopes
