= Pierre Kaufmann =

Brazilian physicist and radio astronomer

Pierre Kaufmann (1938 – 17 February 2017) was a French physicist and astronomer. He worked at Mackenzie University, Unicamp, and USP, and founded research into radio astronomy and solar physics in Brazil.

== Career ==
He studied physics at Mackenzie Presbyterian University, starting in 1957, and graduating in 1961, before going to Leiden University and Groningen University.

He was the principal researcher of the Solar Submillimeter Telescope and Solar-T, and started the Atmospheric Science program at the Brazilian Antarctic Program. He founded research into radio astronomy, spatial geodesy, and solar physics in Brazil. He helped install the first radio telescope in Brazil in 1962, at the Professor Aristóteles Orsini Planetarium, but the antenna was subsequently destroyed by cows. He was funded by FAPESP is its first year of operation, to work on radio star scintillation. He also helped construct radio telescopes in Campos do Jordão and at Itapetinga Radio Observatory.

He was a professor at the Mackenzie Presbyterian University since 1998, where he was coordinator for the Center for Radio Astronomy and Astrophysics, and a senior researcher at the Centre for Semiconductor Components (Portuguese: Centro de Componentes Semicondutores) at UNICAMP, as well as an associate professor at the Polytechnic School of the University of São Paulo. He published over 200 papers, and supervised 17 Masters students, 7 PhD students, and 8 postdocs.

He was also the president of the URSI Brazilian National Committee between 1989 and 2009. He was a member of the IAU, COSPAR, the Brazilian Academy of Sciences (since 1987), and the Brazilian Astronomical Society. He was an associate member of the Royal Astronomical Society.

== Personal life ==
Kaufman was born in 1938. He grew up on a farm in Aix-en-Provence, south France, and became interested in astronomy as a child. His family moved to Brazil in 1941, fleeing World War II. He joined the Association of Amateur Astronomers as a teenager, in 1954. He had a brother.

He died in São Paulo on 17 February 2017, aged 78.
