= Mackenzie Presbyterian University =

University in São Paulo, Brazil

Coordinates: 23.547°S 46.652°W

- Universidade Presbiteriana Mackenzie
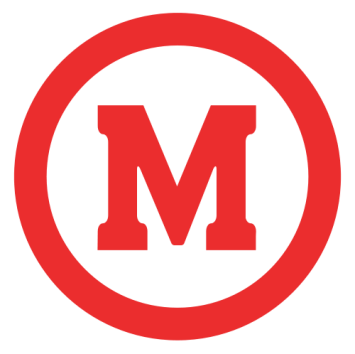
- Mackenzie Presbyterian University
- Motto: Tradição e Pioneirismo na Educação (Portuguese)
- Motto in English: Tradition and Pioneering in Education
- Type: Private, non-profit
- Established: 1870; 156 years ago, 1952; 74 years ago as a university
- Affiliations: Presbyterian Church of Brazil
- Chancellor: The Rev. Dr. Davi Charles Gomes
- Rector: Dr. Benedito Aguiar Neto
- Vice rector: Dr. Marcel Mendes
- Students: 40,000+
- Location: São Paulo (Campus Higienópolis), Barueri (Campus Alphaville), Campinas, Brazil
- Colours: Red Black
- Website: mackenzie.br

The Mackenzie Presbyterian University (Portuguese: Universidade Presbiteriana Mackenzie or UPM) is a private, denominational higher education institution in Brazil. It is one of the oldest educational institutions in the country, founded in 1870 as the American School by missionaries from Pennsylvania, United States. The university is maintained by the Mackenzie Presbyterian Institute, a private, non-profit, educational association. The university is regarded nationally and internationally as a center of excellence, having graduated numerous important names in Brazilian history.

Mackenzie is the alma mater of governors, ministers, congressmen, executives and founders of major companies, Olympic medalists, including the winners of 14 gold medals at the Paralympic Games, and internationally awarded artists, including one Pritzker Prize winner. The institution's graduates are known as Mackenzistas. Currently, Mackenzie Presbyterian University leads the ranking among private institutions in the state of São Paulo, according to the RUF 2024 (Folha University Ranking). Furthermore, it achieved the top spot in the "Job Market" category among all universities evaluated nationally.

== History ==
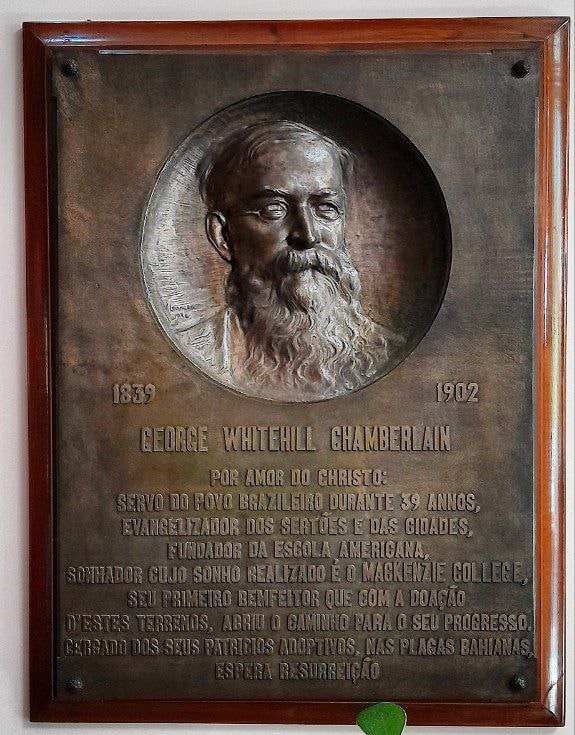
George Whitehill Chamberlain.

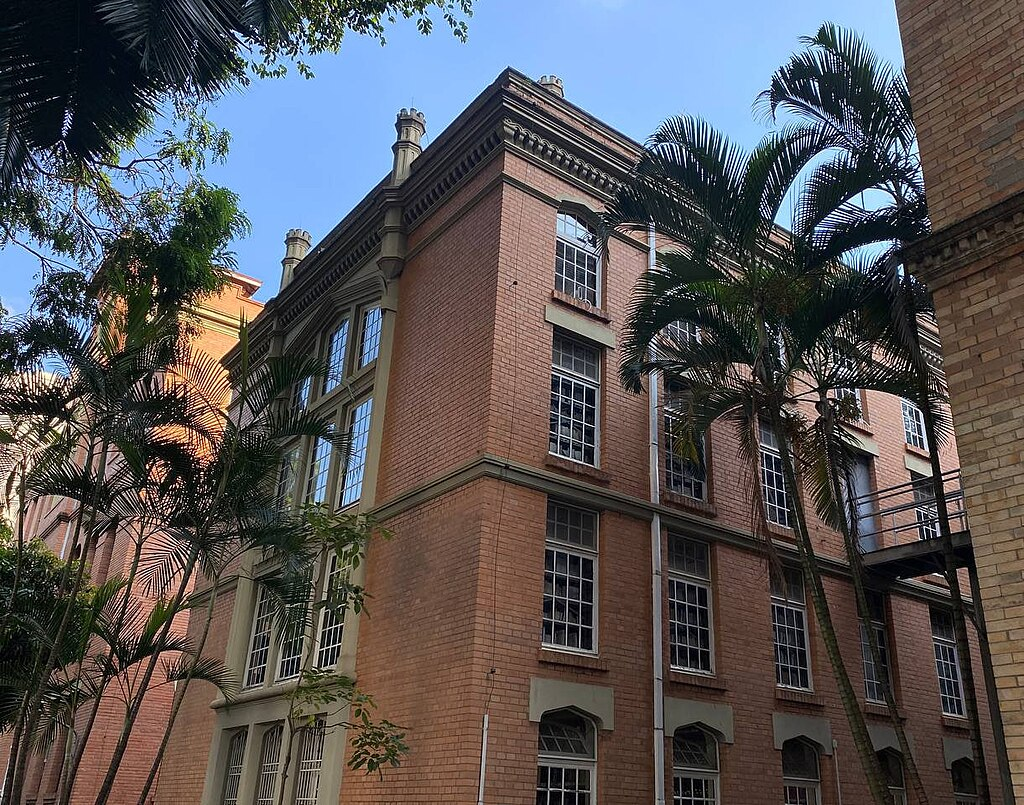
George Alexander Library.

In 1870, the American Presbyterian missionary Rev. George Whitehill Chamberlain and his wife Mary Annesley founded a private grammar school inside their home. The classes were held in their living room and, a few years later, the "American School" was established as a center of excellence in São Paulo. The Chamberlains' American School was revolutionary for the Brazilian standards at that time: no corporal punishment on students was permitted, and both boys and girls could attend classes. Even though the Chamberlains were openly Presbyterians, students from all ethnic backgrounds, social classes, and religious denominations were welcome. The fame of academic rigor allied to religious tolerance soon reached the United States. In 1896, John Theron Mackenzie, an attorney from Phelps, New York, and his sisters donated US$50,000 "for the establishment of an engineering school to be built under the auspices of Mr. Chamberlain". The Mackenzie building was built the next year, and the college was named in their honor.

In the 1940s, Mackenzie began to introduce new units and courses, such as the School of Philosophy, Sciences and Letters in 1946; the School of Architecture in 1947 and the School of Economics in 1950. In 1952, with four higher education institutions, Mackenzie was recognized as a university by decree signed by then-president Getúlio Vargas. In the same year, Dr. Henrique Pegado took over as the university's first rector. In 1955, classes began for the first class of the newly created School of Law, which since its foundation has stood out as one of the most traditional schools in São Paulo, alongside the School of Law of the Pontifical Catholic University of São Paulo and the School of Law of the University of São Paulo, in Largo de São Francisco.

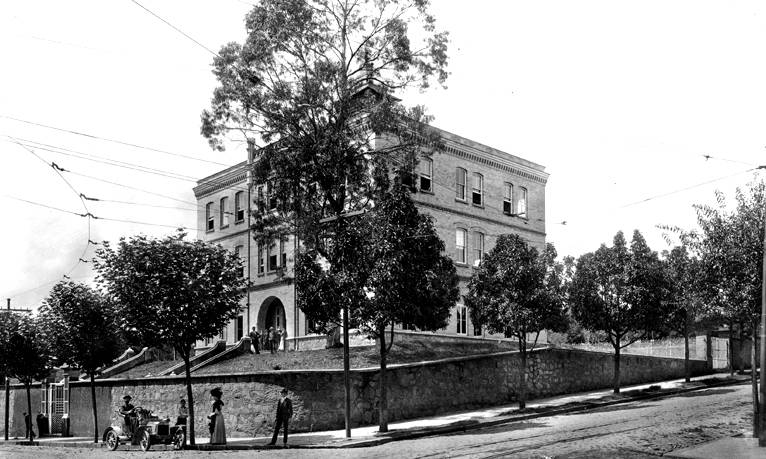
Mackenzie College at the XIX century.

In 1965, Mackenzie appointed Esther de Figueiredo Ferraz to the position of rector. She was the first woman to hold the position of rector at a Brazilian university. During Esther de Figueiredo Ferraz's term, students from Mackenzie Presbyterian University and the University of São Paulo engaged in a conflict known as the Battle of Maria Antônia. At the time, the Faculty of Philosophy, Sciences and Letters of the University of São Paulo (which later changed its name to FFLCH) was located on Maria Antônia Street. There was a major violent and bloody conflict between pro-dictatorship and anti-dictatorship students, an event that became known as the Battle of Maria Antônia. Left-wing students, who opposed the military regime, gathered in the USP building, while right-wing students, in contrast, took up residence in the Mackenzie building, a group called the CCC - Communist Hunting Command. Due to the contrasting ideological differences, the conflict was inevitable and only ended with the repression of the Riot Squad requested by the then rector Esther de Figueiredo Ferraz.

The São Paulo campus currently has over 50 buildings and is located in Higienópolis, an upscale neighborhood in São Paulo. Around 35,000 students attend over 40 courses at Mackenzie's various campuses. The São Paulo and Tamboré campuses offer courses ranging from early childhood education to graduate studies. The Brasília campus serves high school and graduate studies, which are also present in Campinas, Rio de Janeiro and Recife.

Mackenzie Presbyterian University is a confessional institution. As a Presbyterian institution, it is governed by the reformed evangelical Christian faith and the Calvinist ethics of vocation. Thus, Mackenzie's commitment is to stimulate knowledge of "human and divine sciences"

== Notable alumni ==
Notable among the university's alumni are governors, ministers, jurists, philosophers, politicians, journalists, Olympic athletes, businesspeople, great artists, and figures from Brazilian history. Many have gone on to teach in their respective fields at Mackenzie.

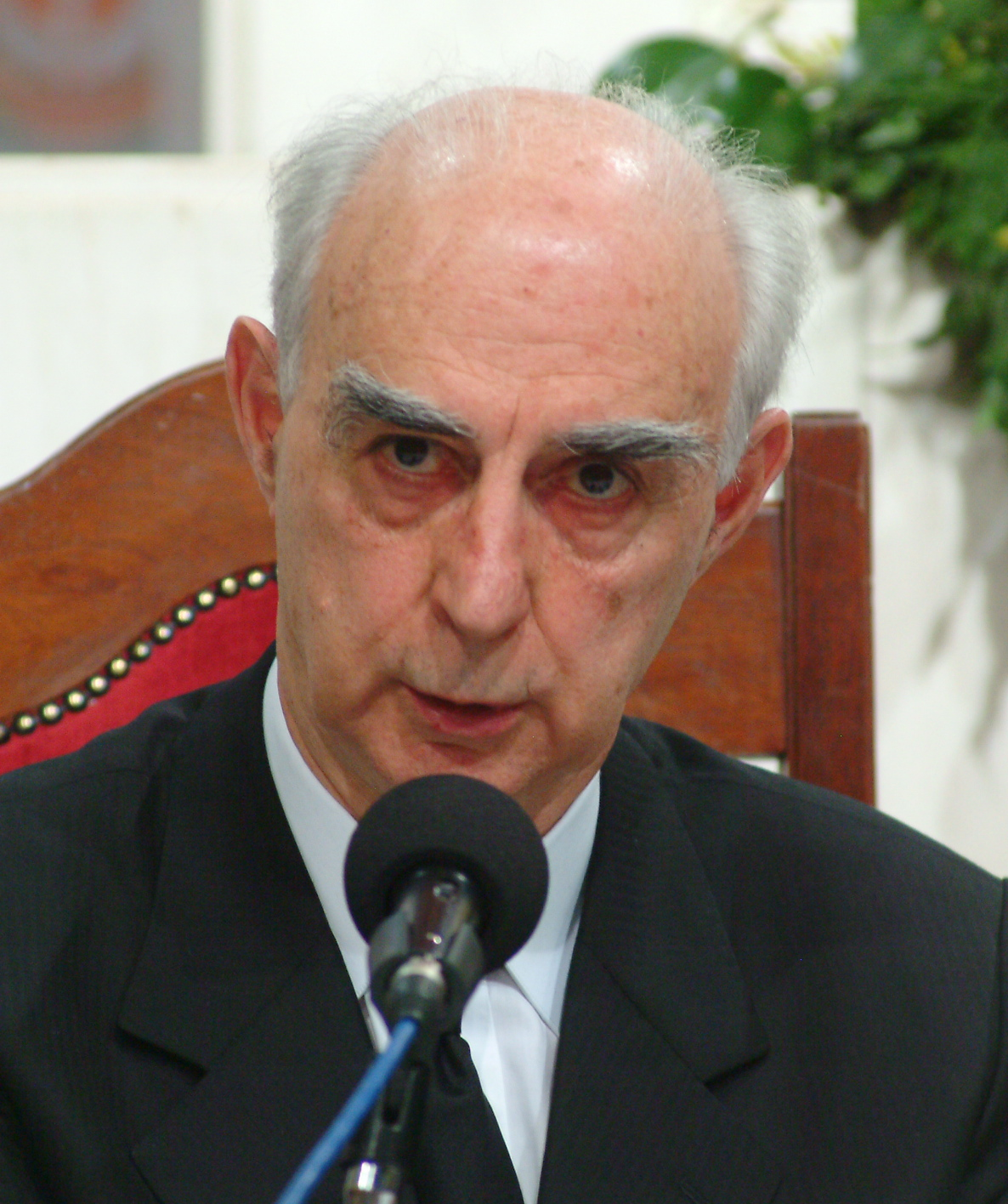
Cláudio Salvador Lembo – Professor, lawyer, writer, and the 57th Governor of the State of São Paulo.

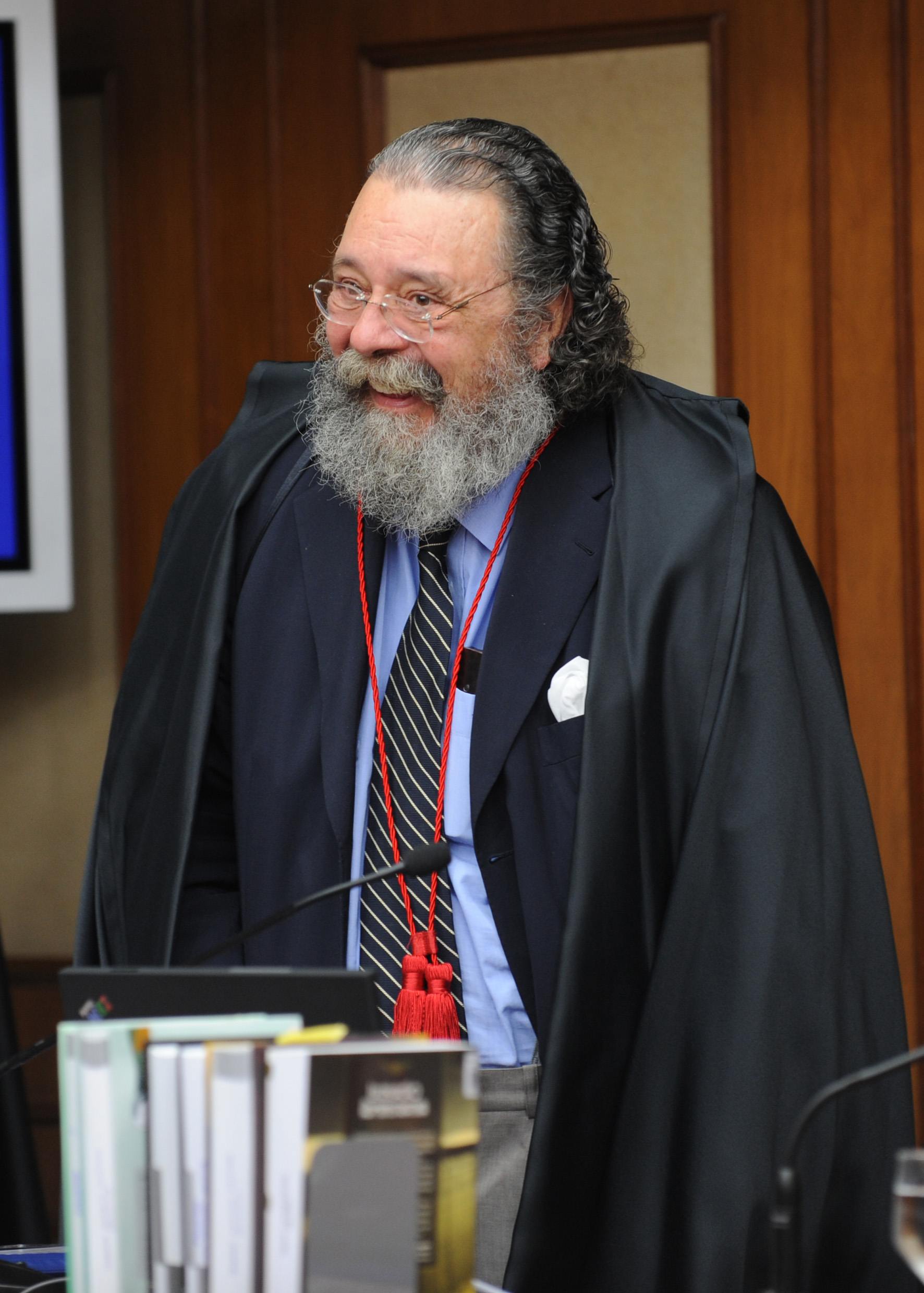
Eros Roberto Grau – Former Justice of the Supreme Federal Court (Supremo Tribunal Federal), professor, and constitutional law expert.

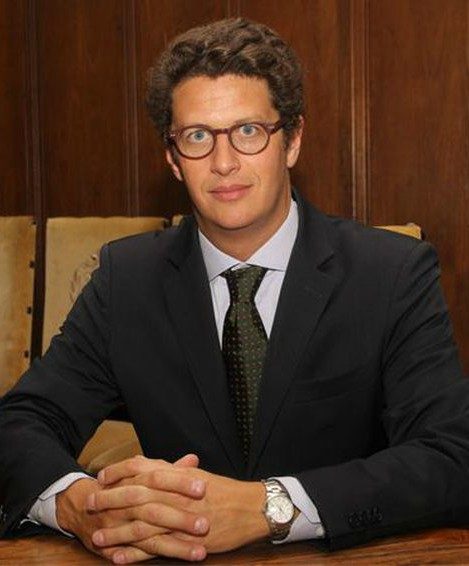
Ricardo de Aquino Salles – Lawyer, administrator, politician and Brazil’s Minister of the Environment.

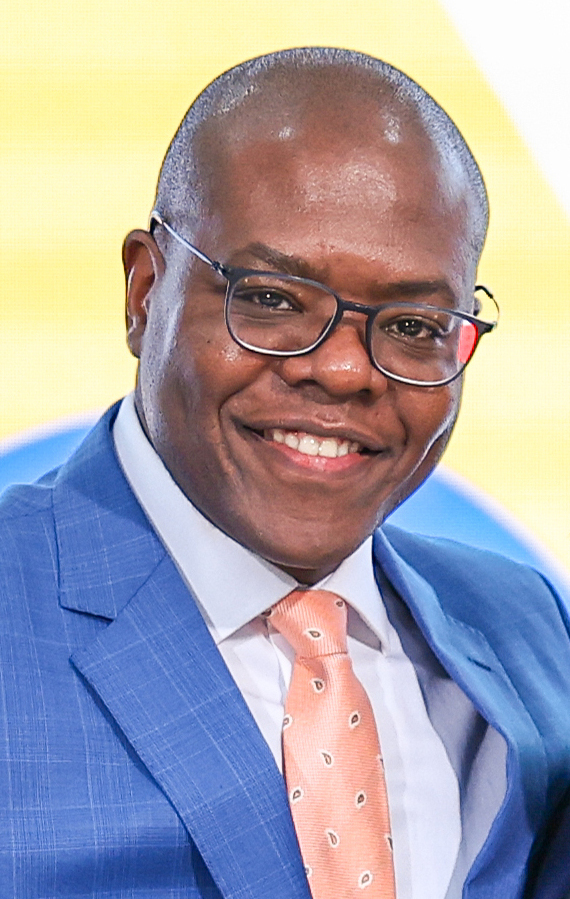
Silvio Luiz de Almeida – Lawyer, philosopher, university professor and Brazil’s Minister of Human Rights.

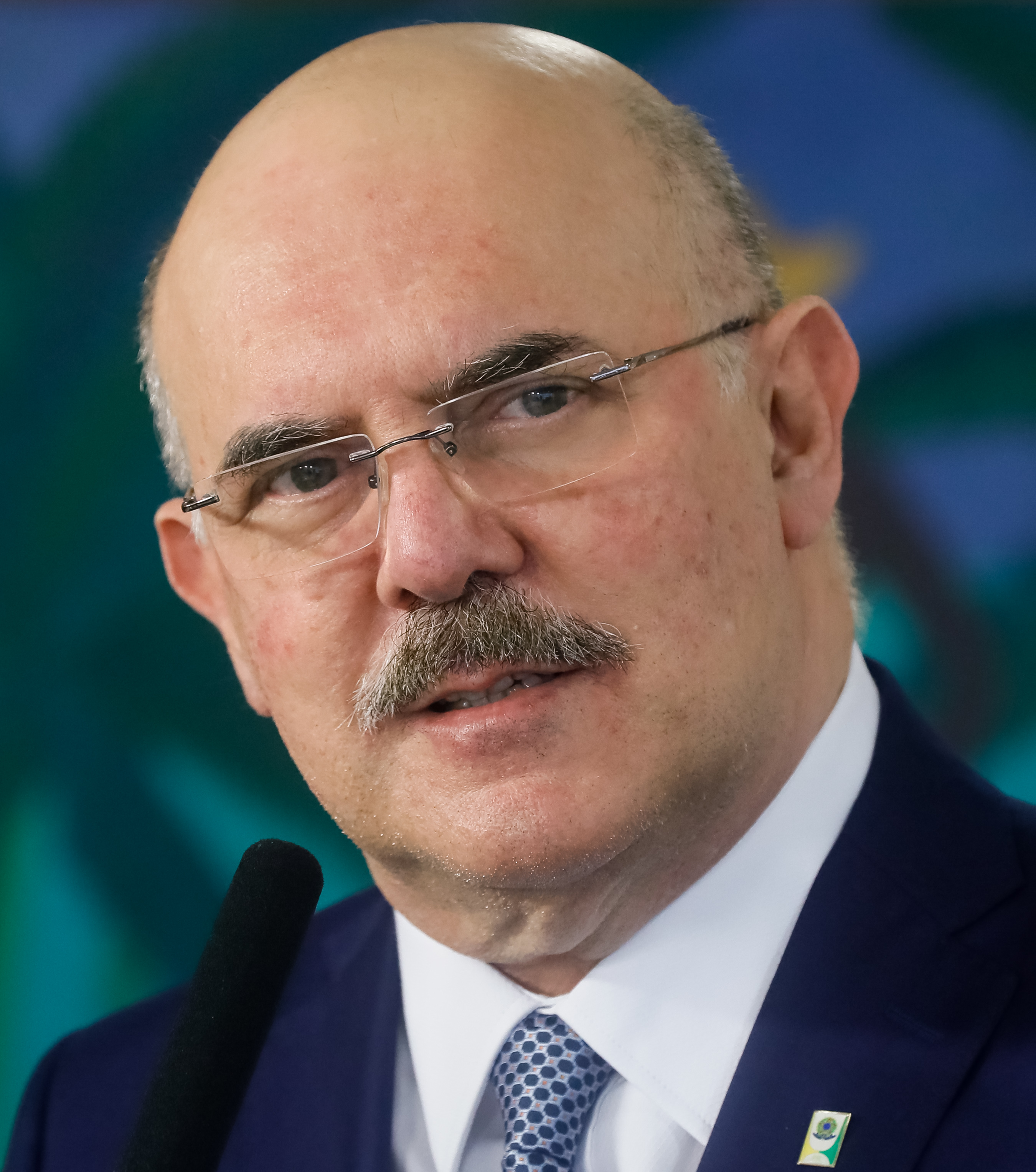
Milton Ribeiro – Presbyterian pastor, theologian, lawyer, professor and Brazil’s Minister of Education.

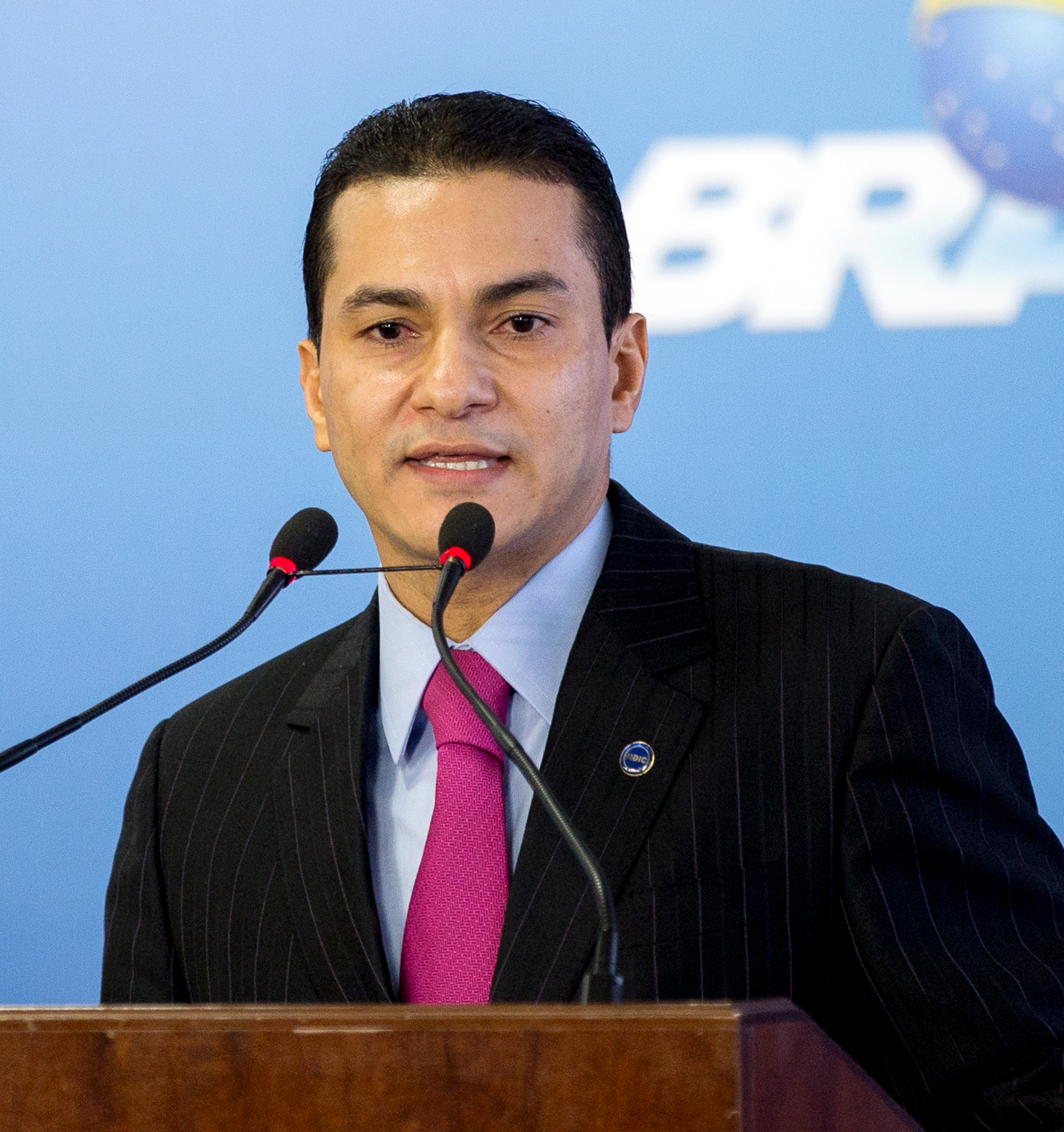
Marcos Pereira, lawyer and politician. He served as Brazil’s Minister of Industry, Foreign Trade and Services, and is a prominent figure in the Brazilian Chamber of Deputies, having held the position of Vice President of the House.

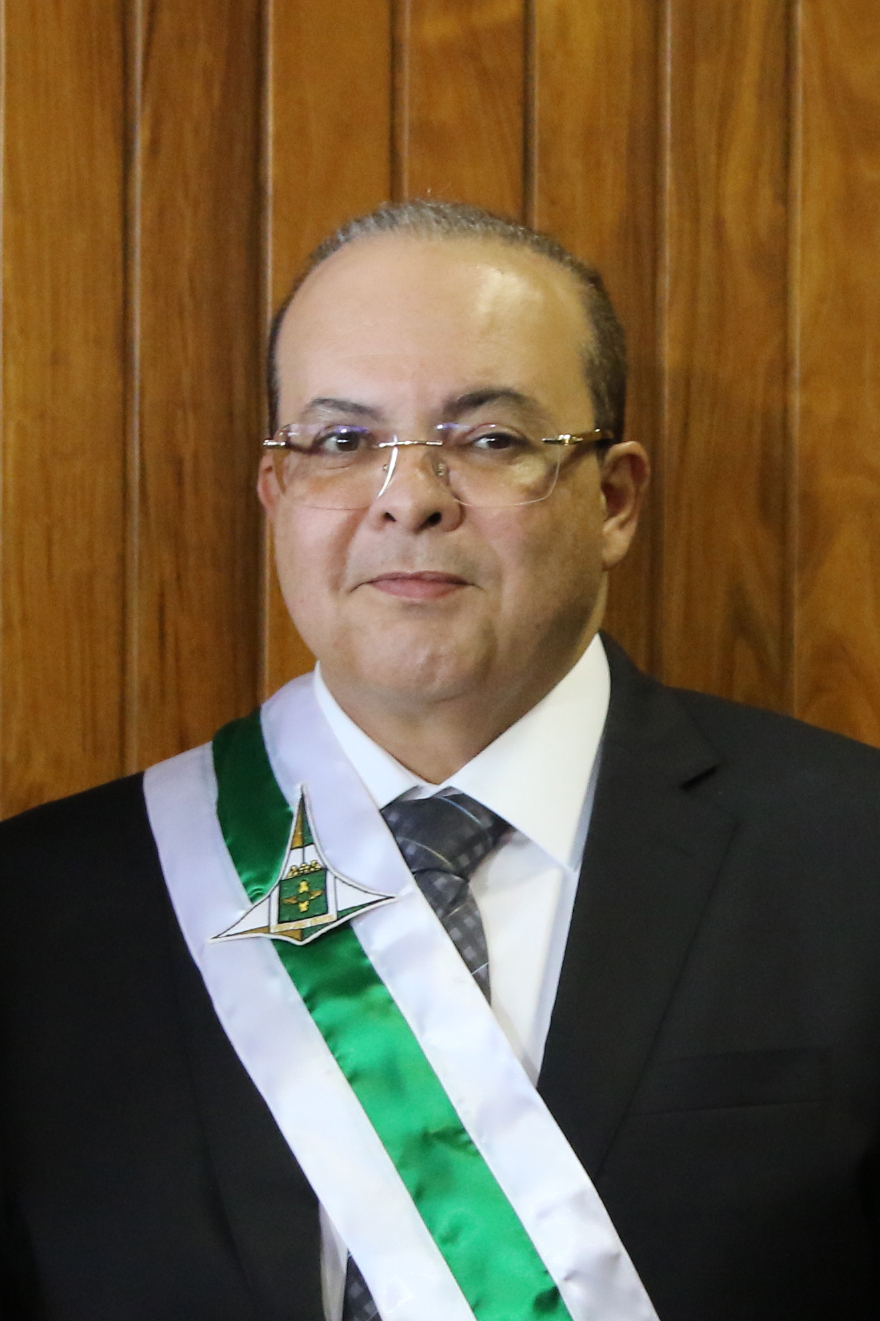
Ibaneis Rocha, lawyer and 19th governor of the Federal District (Capital of Brazil).

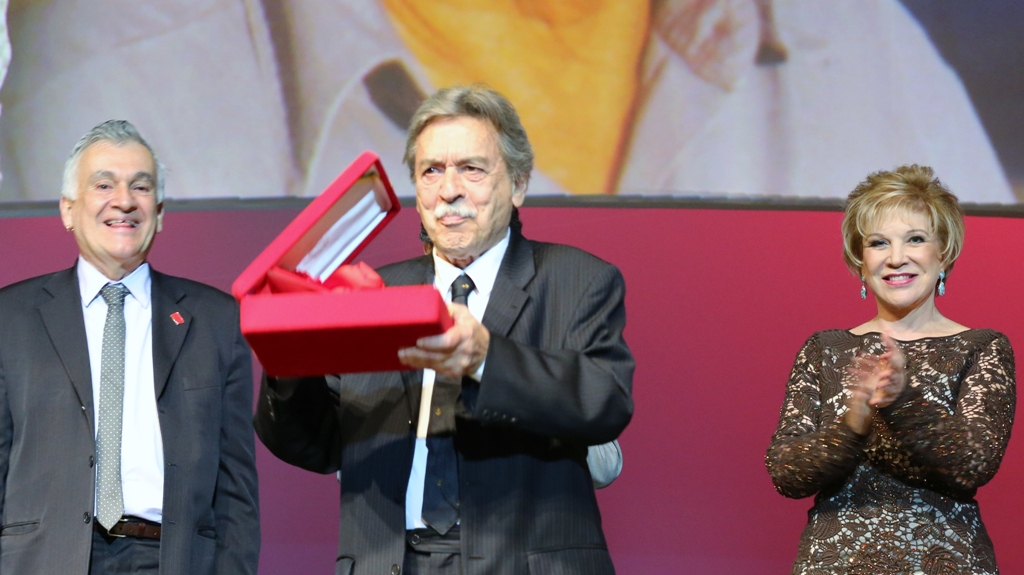
Paulo Mendes da Rocha, Award-winning Brazilian architect, winner of the Pritzker Prize

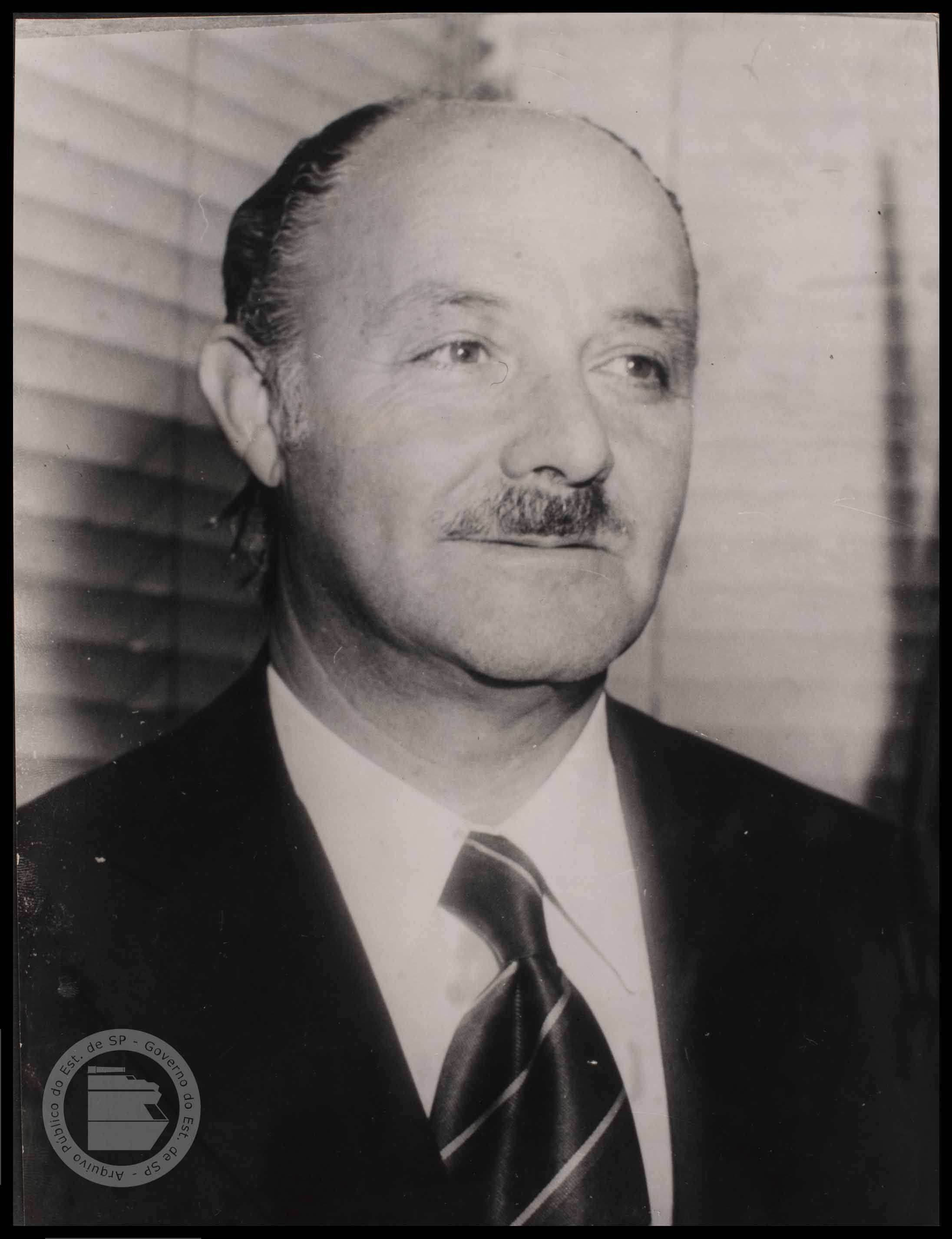
Max Feffer, owner of the Suzano Group, led the revolutionary production of eucalyptus pulp, consolidating the company as a global powerhouse. (B.S.)

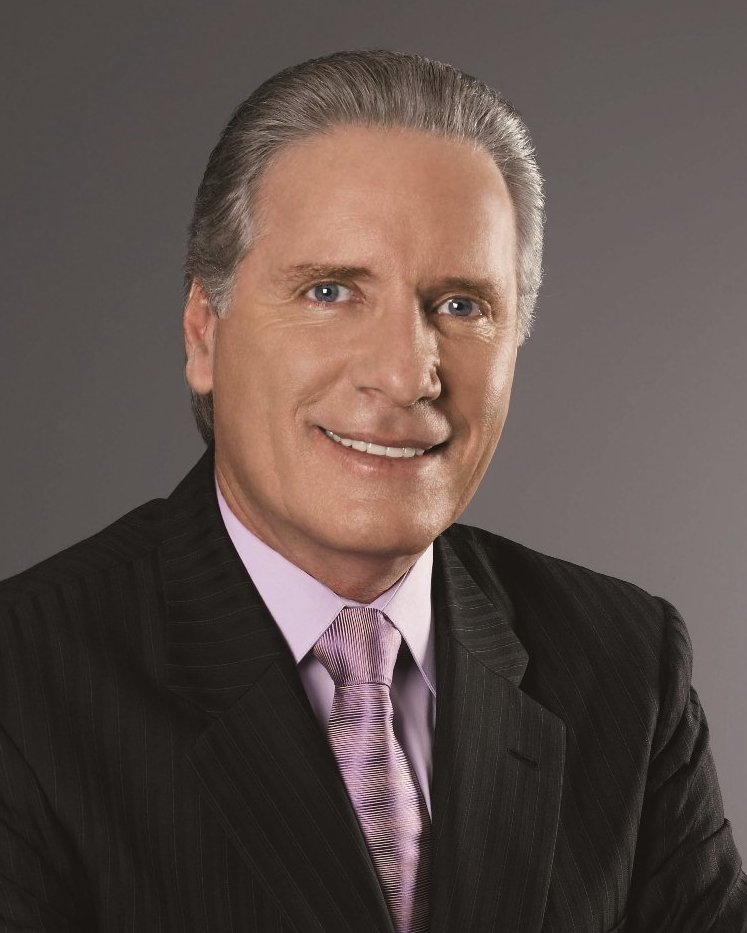
Roberto Justus, brazilian investor, businessman and television personality. He is best known for O Aprendiz, which is the Brazilian version of The Apprentice.

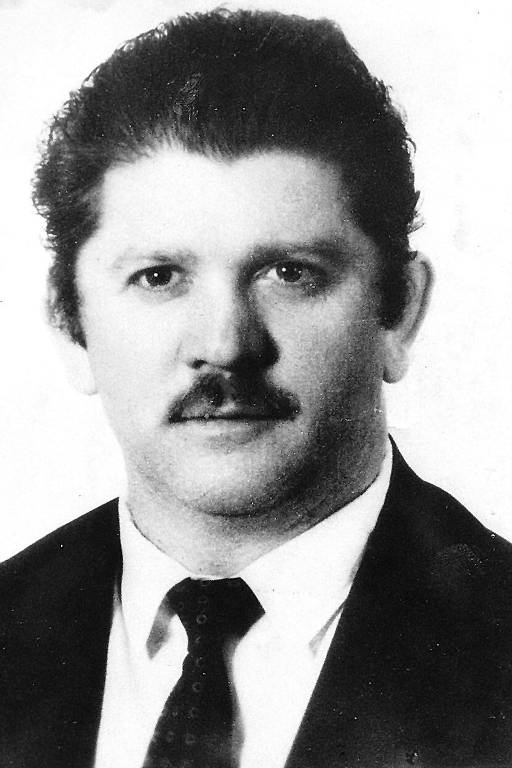
Rubens Paiva, civil engineer and Congressman at the Brazilian Chamber of Deputies, opponent of military dictatorship in Brazil, tortured and murdered by the same dictatorship in 1971.

Ives Gandra da Silva Martins – Renowned constitutional lawyer, legal scholar, and member of the Brazilian Academy of Philosophy. He is considered one of the most influential conservative legal thinkers in Brazil.

José Roberto Batochio – Eminent criminal lawyer, often referred to as a “bastion of Brazilian criminal law”; former president of the OAB and active in high-profile legal defense.

Álvaro Villaça Azevedo – One of the most respected civil law scholars in Brazil, known for his extensive academic and legal contributions.

Jefferson Aparecido Dias – Federal prosecutor and university professor. He served as Brazil’s Federal Prosecutor for Citizens’ Rights (Procurador Federal dos Direitos do Cidadão) and was involved in key constitutional and civil rights cases.

Carlos Miguel Aidar – Prominent lawyer and former President of the Brazilian Bar Association (Ordem dos Advogados do Brasil – OAB).

Antonio Carlos Rodrigues do Amaral – Renowned lawyer and academic, recognized for his work in tax and business law.

Sérgio Pinto Martins – Federal judge and prolific scholar in labor law, widely cited in academic and judicial circles.

Surrealist artist André Breton is claimed as an alumnus, although this might reflect a mixup with his friend and collaborator Benjamin Péret, who lived in Brazil in 1929-1931; modernist painter Anita Malfatti; Chu Ming Silveira, a Chinese-Brazilian architect and designer, creator of the design of the Orelhão, an iconic public telephone booth whose fame spread throughout the country and Latin America.

Adolpho Lindenberg – Brazilian civil engineer, architect, writer and political activist. A cousin and disciple of Plinio Corrêa de Oliveira, the founder of Tradition, Family and Property. He was also the founder of CAL (Construtora Adolpho Lindenberg), one of the most famous construction companies in São Paulo, known for transforming the city's landscape with neoclassical buildings. His neoclassical style was named "Lindenberg style".

Brazil's most known basketball player Oscar Schmidt; Car racer Émerson Fittipaldi; Sea explorer Amyr Klink;

Boris Casoy – Veteran journalist and television anchor, known for his work in political commentary and for having served as editor-in-chief of Jornal da Noite on TV Bandeirantes.

Ney Gonçalves Dias – Journalist, writer, and broadcaster, recognized for his long-standing career in Brazilian media and his presence in radio and television since the 1970s.

Gabriela Prioli - criminal lawyer, university professor, political commentator and TV presenter, known nationally for having been part of the "O Grande Debate" segment on the CNN Brasil network.

Businessmen Márcio Cypriano (CEO Bradesco); Ivan Zurita (CEO Nestlé, Brasil); Danilo Talanskas (Otis Elevator Company) and Emerson Kapaz.

Maria Lucrécia Eunice Facciolla Paiva who lobbied for the enactment of Law 9.140/95, which acknowledged the deaths of people disappeared for their political activities during the military dictatorship, and took legal steps to end the violence and illegal land expropriation committed against indigenous people and was involved in including indigenous rights in the new Constitution of Brazil.

== Schools and colleges ==
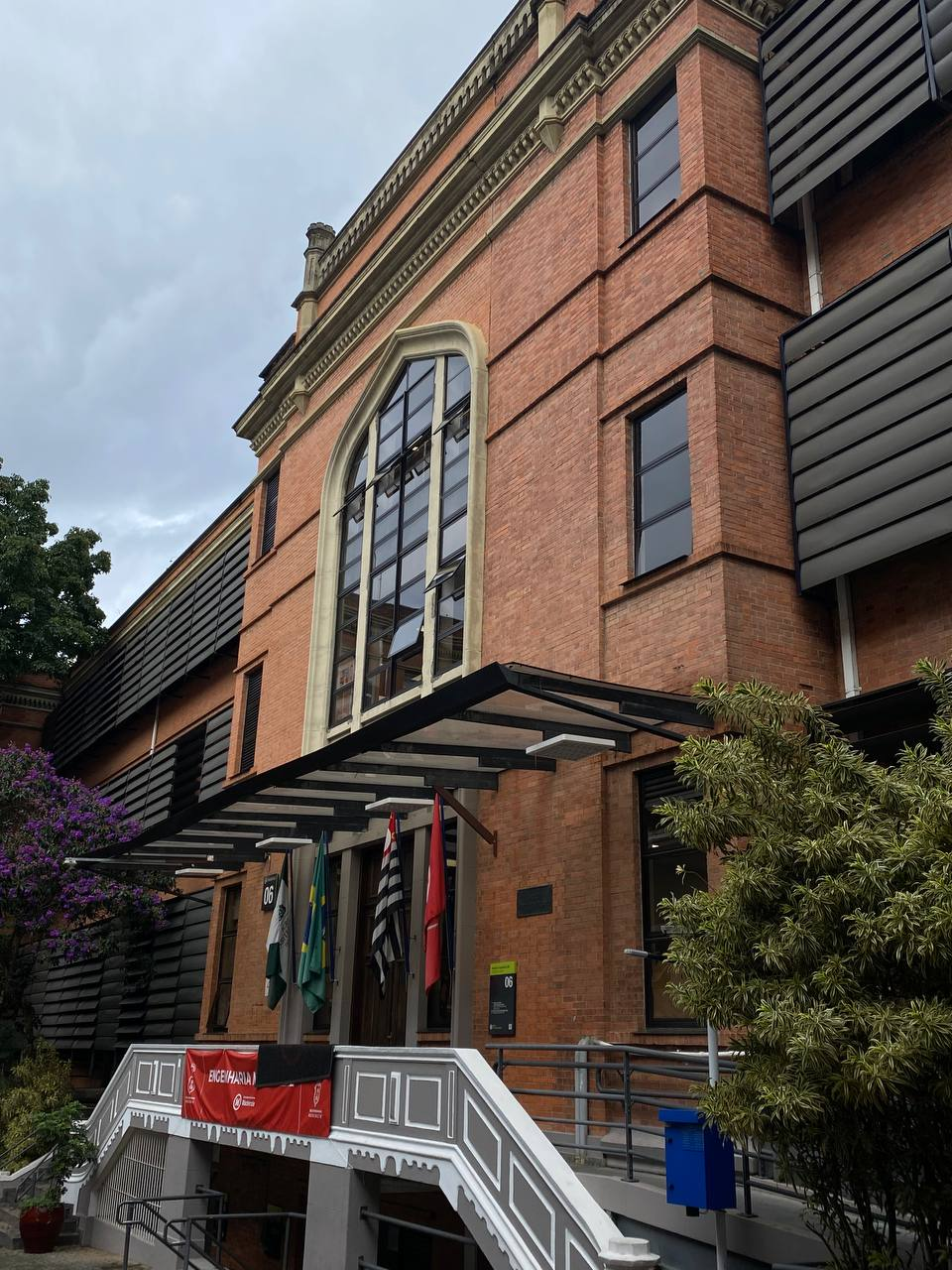
School of Engineering - Henrique Pegado Building.

School of Engineering

Graduate School of Theology

School of Architecture and City Planning

Biological Sciences and Health College

College of Economics, Accounting, Business and Marketing (CCSA)

College of Computer Science and Information Technology

College of Communication and the Arts

School of Law

College of Physical Education

College of Philosophy, Language, and Education

College of Psychology

== Gallery ==
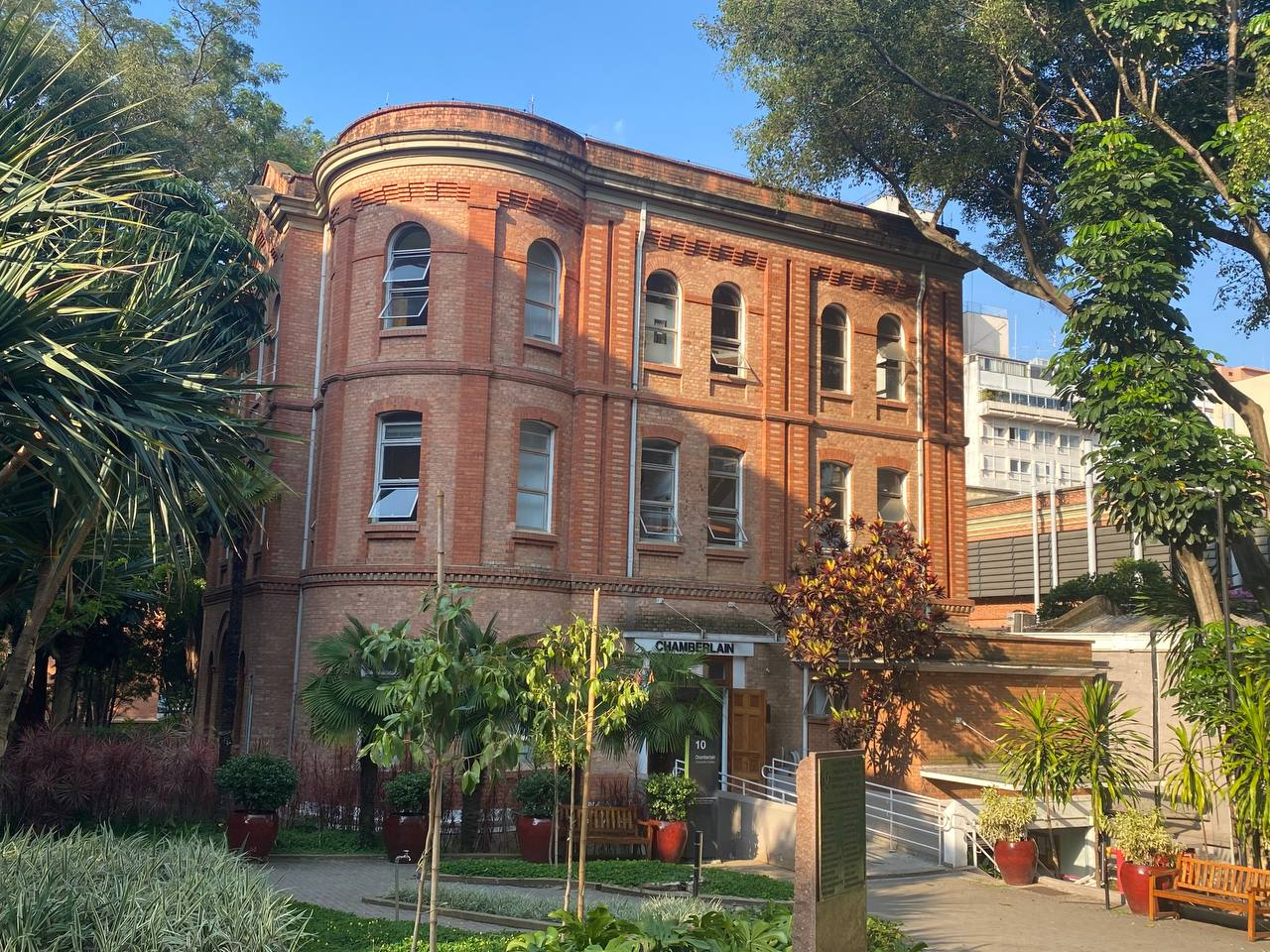
Chamberlain Building.

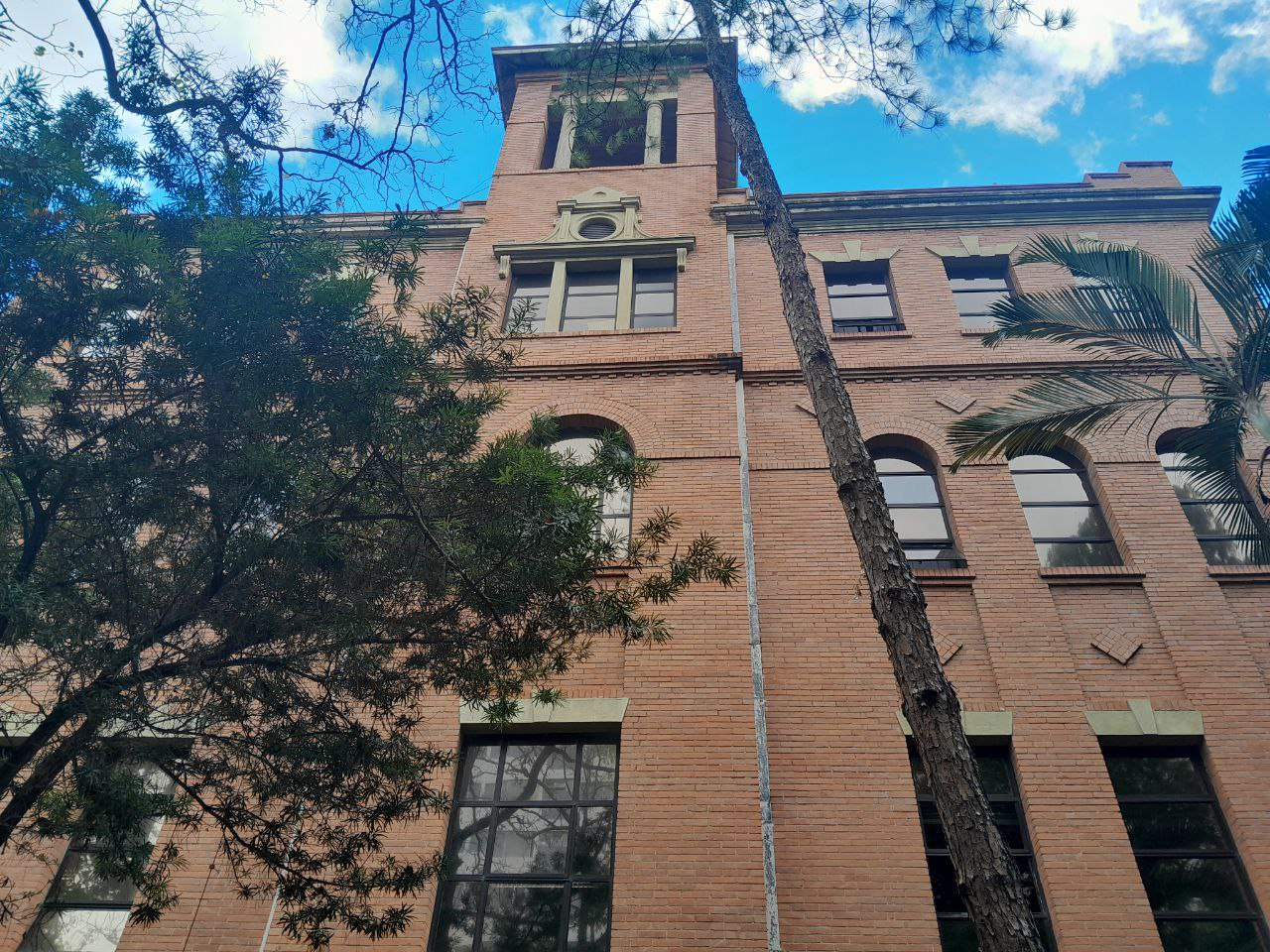
School of Law - Horace Manley Lane Building.

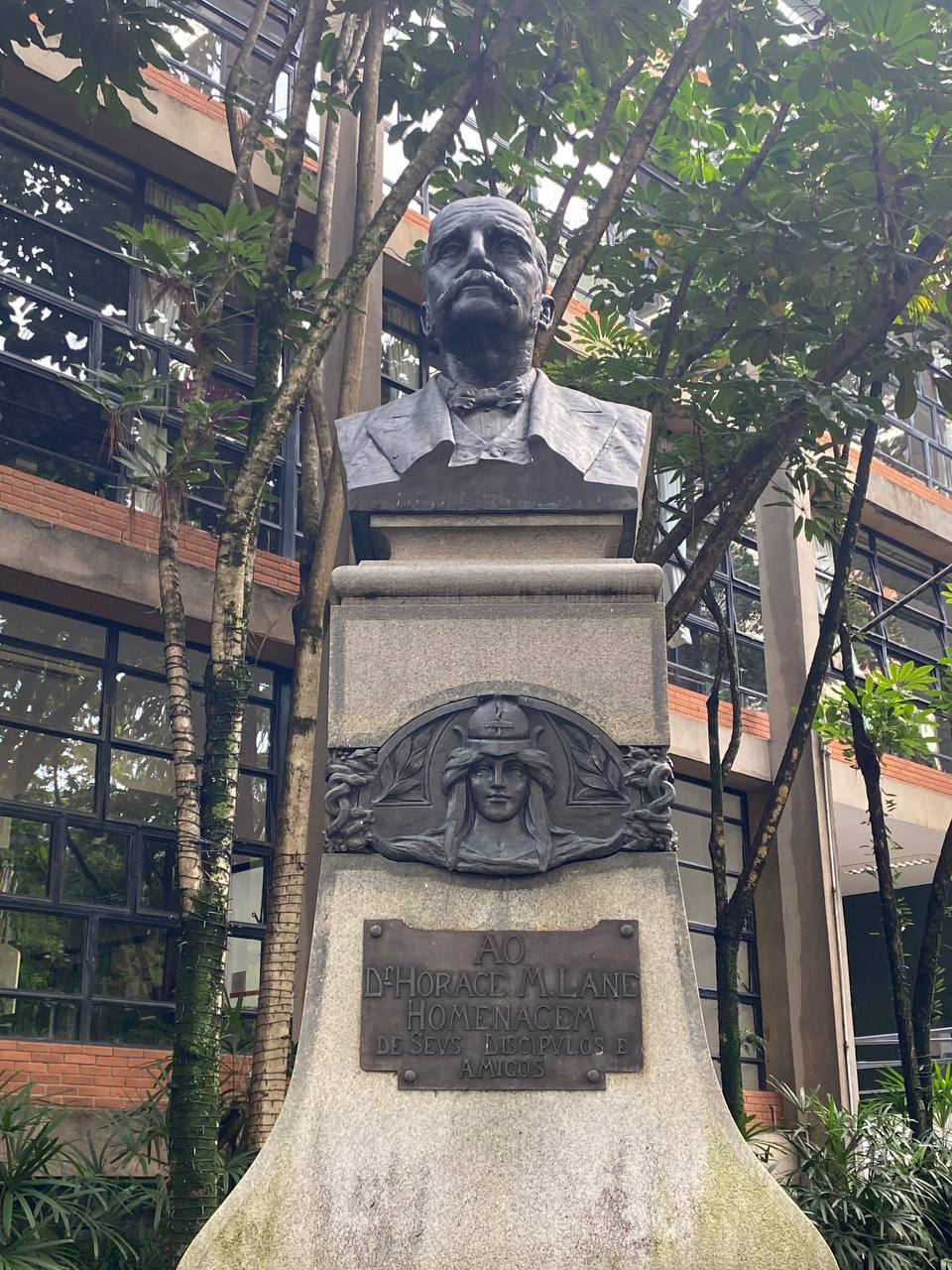
Horace Manley Lane Bust.

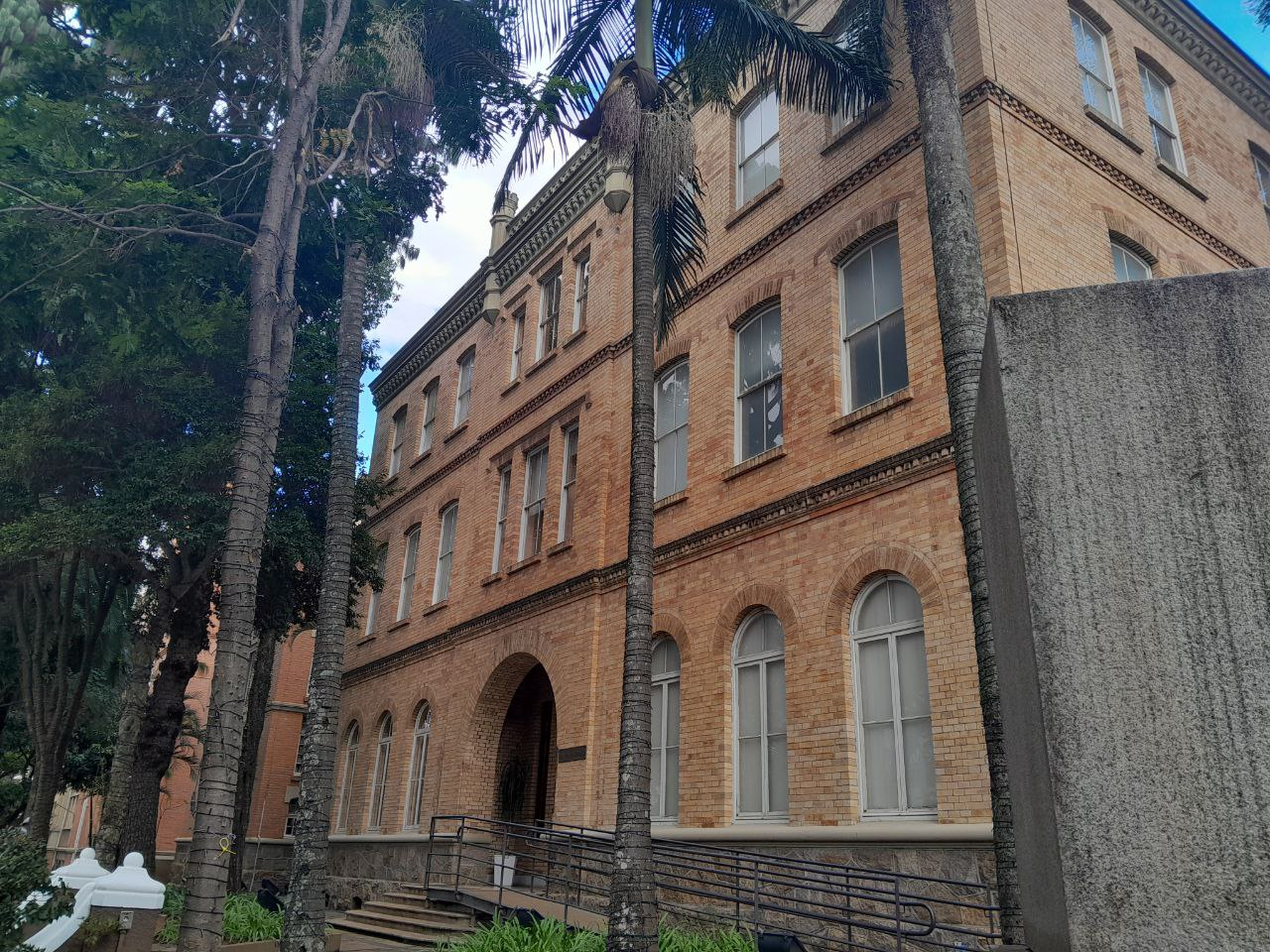
John Mackenzie Building.

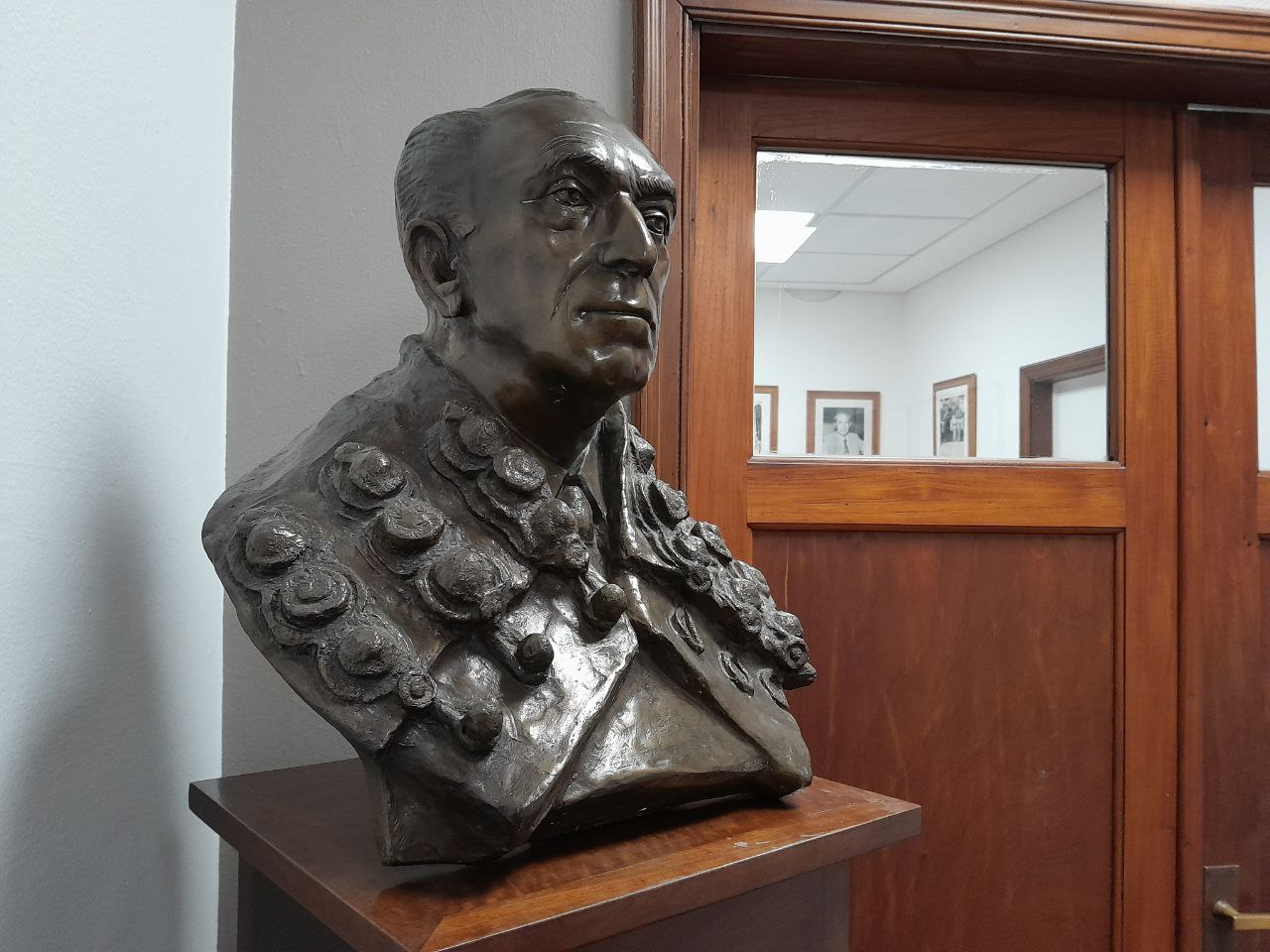
Bust of Antonio Luiz Ippólito, Full Professor at the university.

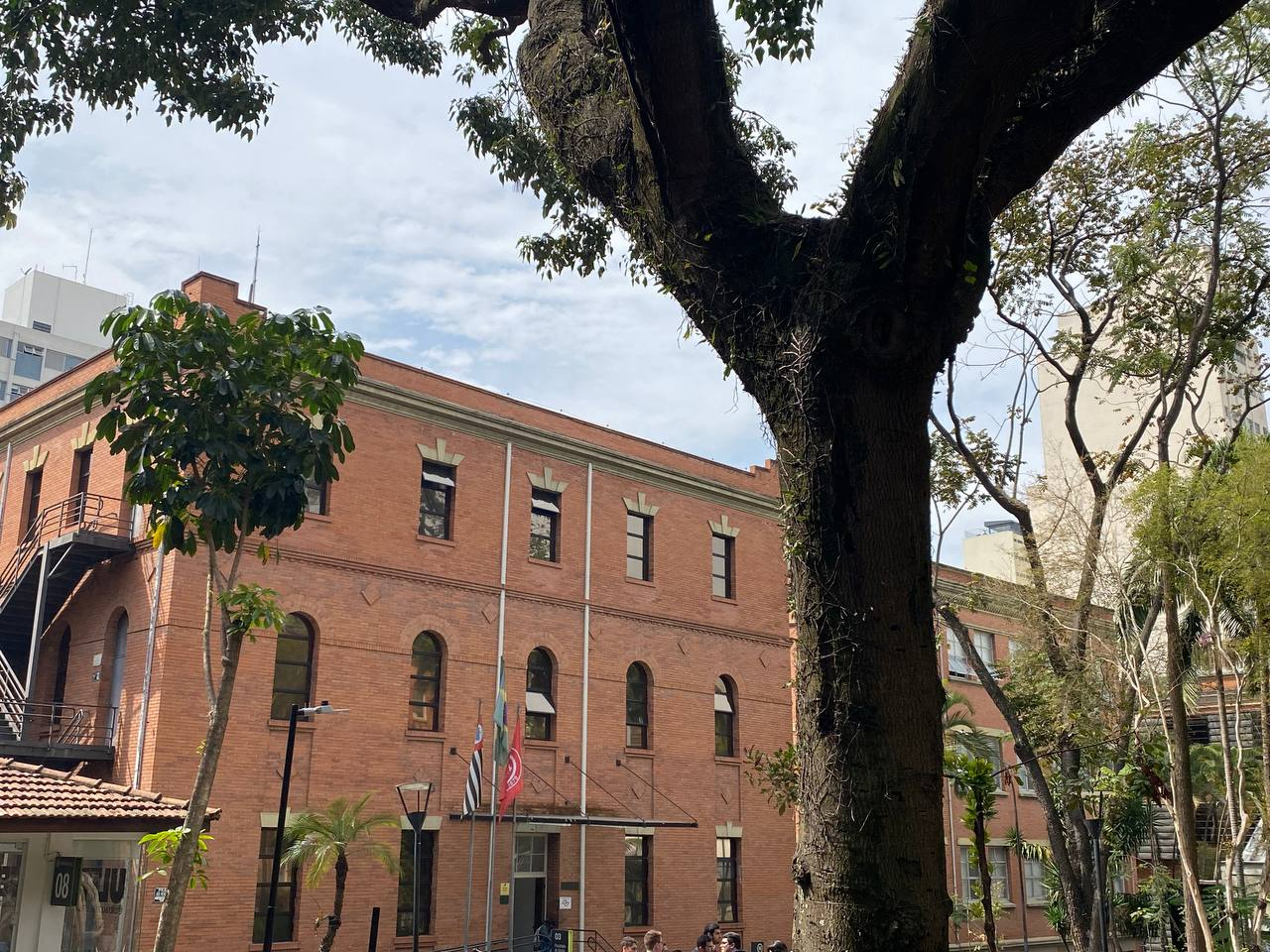
View of the rear entrance of the School of Law.

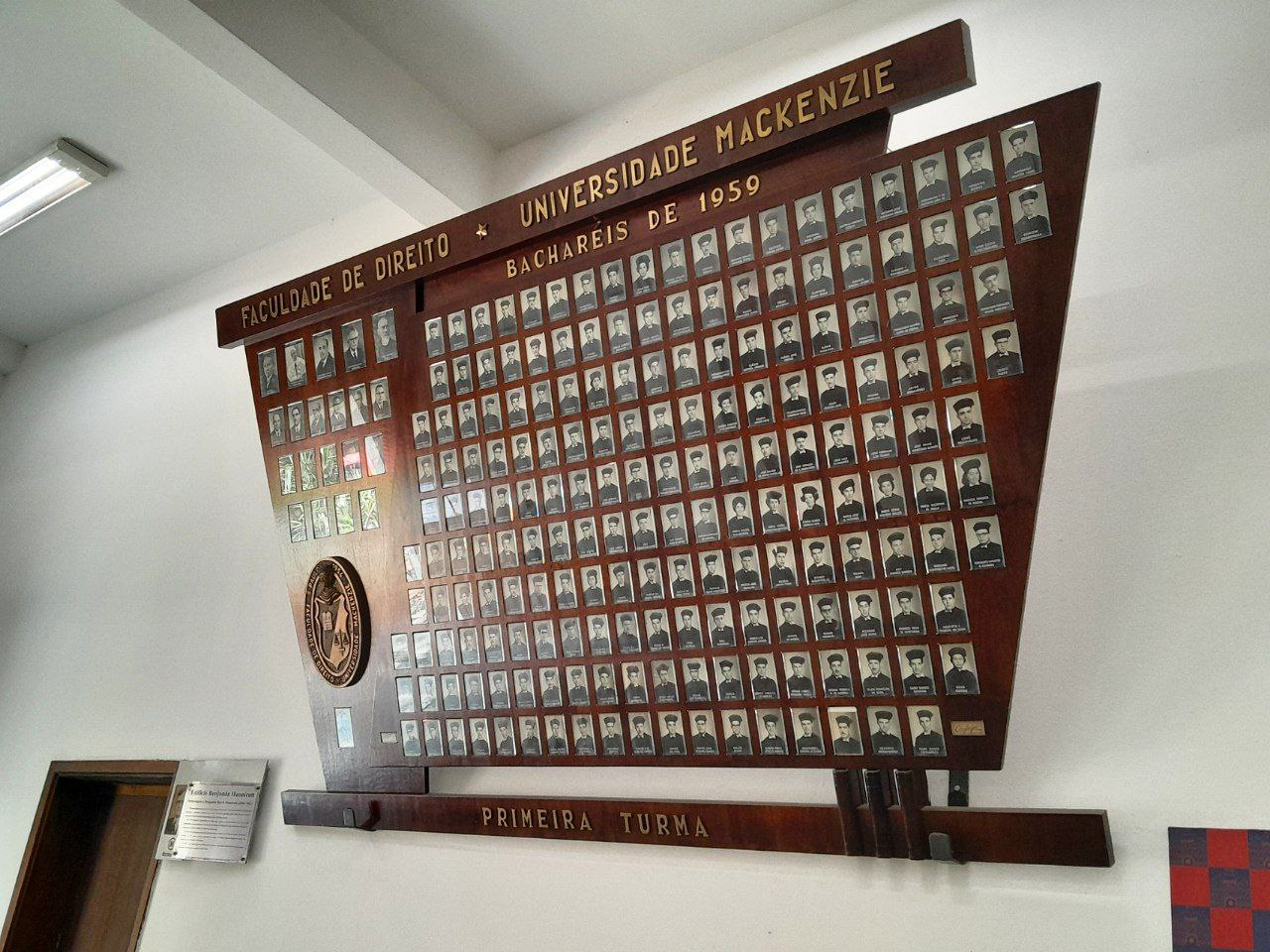
Gallery of Graduated of 1959 - School of Law.

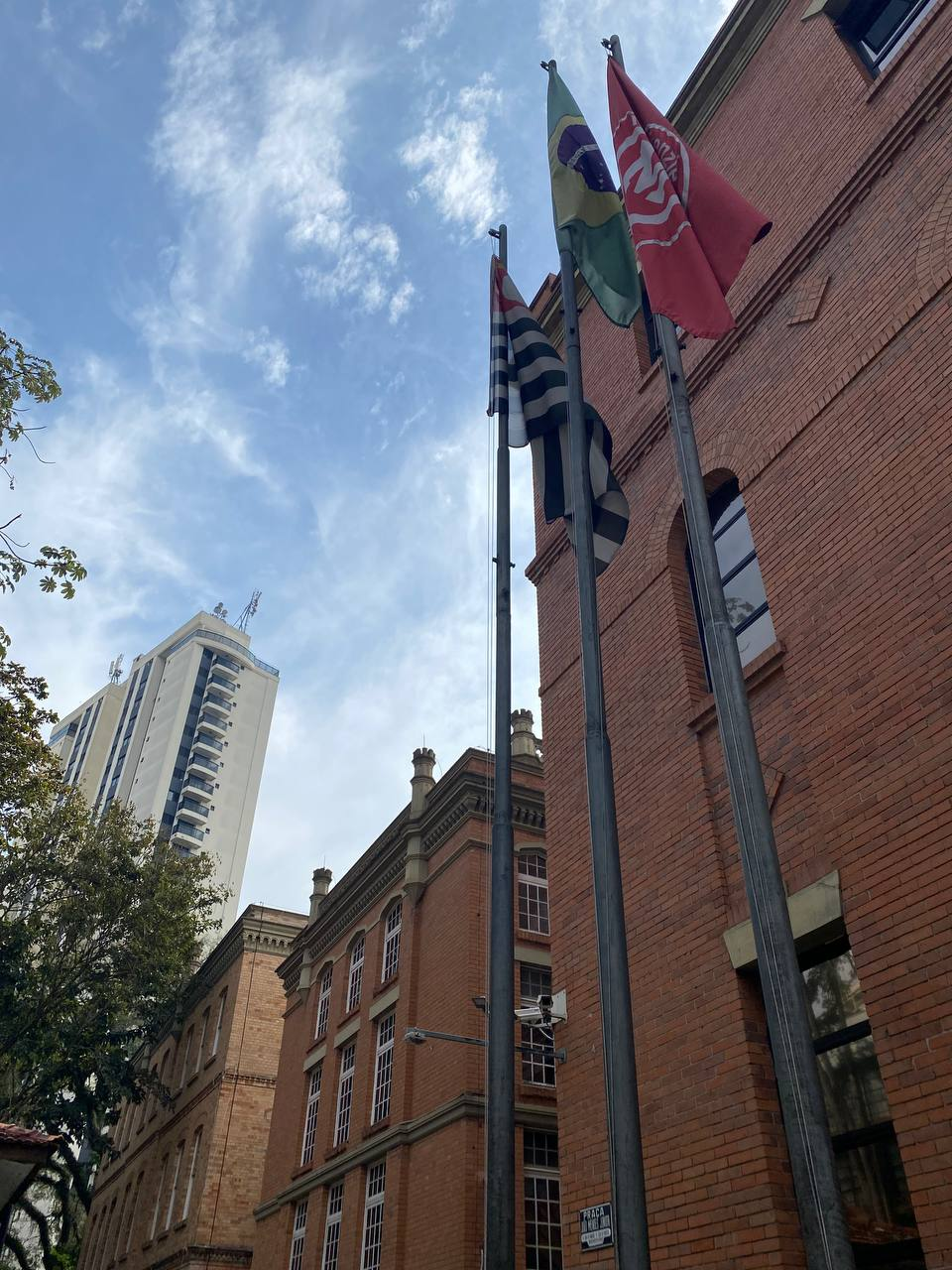
View of the historic buildings.

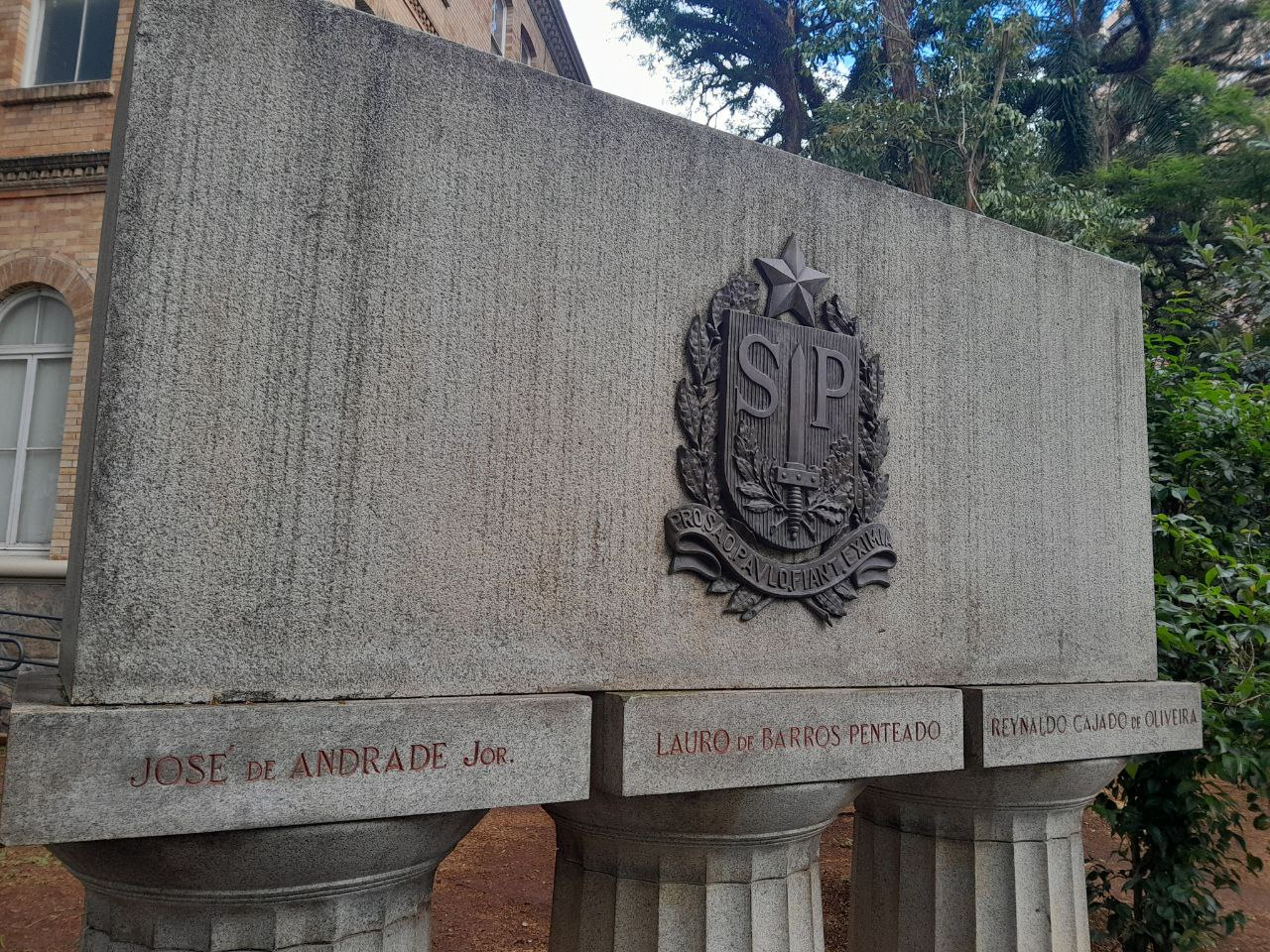
Tribute to the University Students who fought in the Constitutional War of 1932.

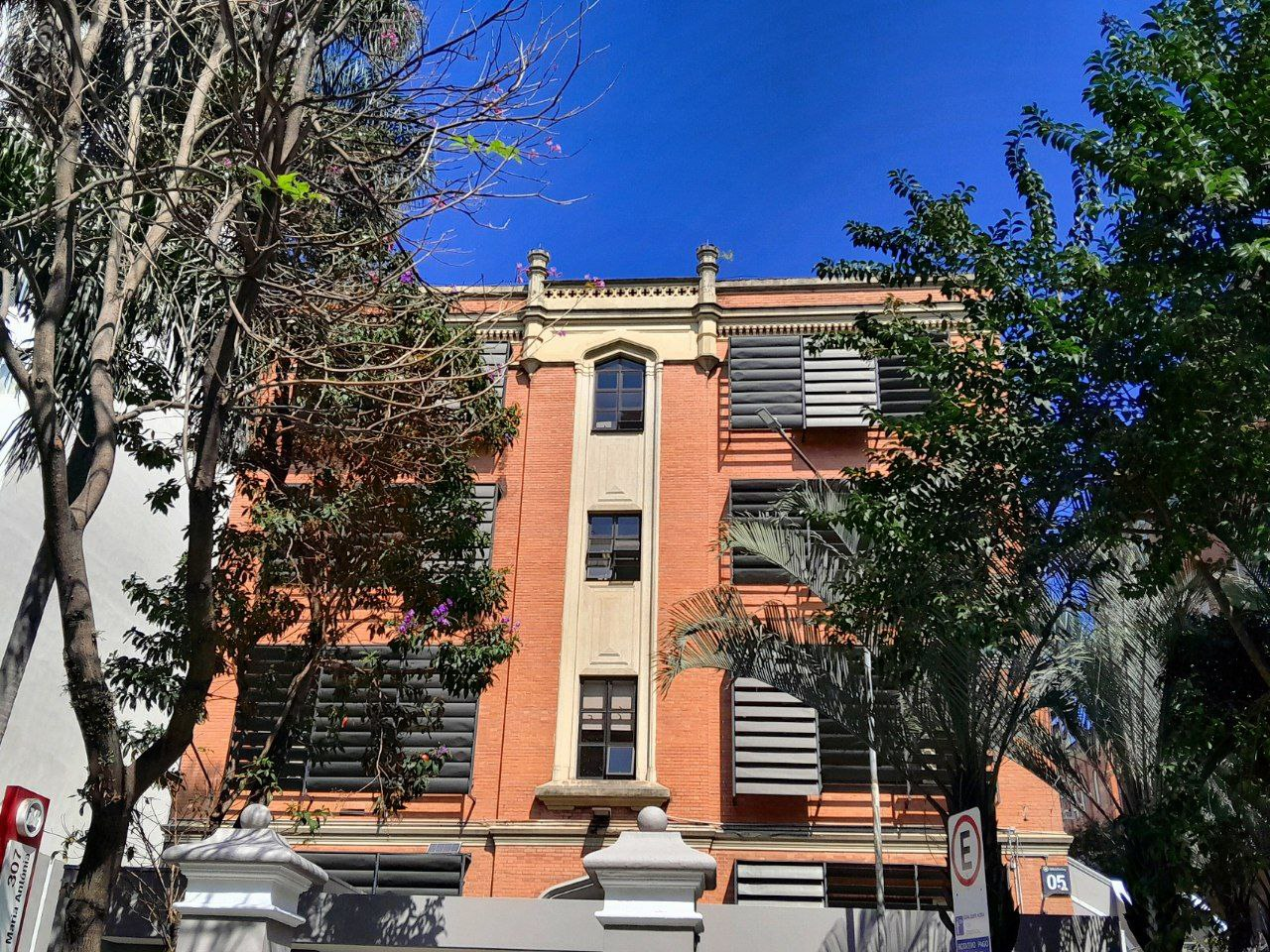
William Alfred Wadell Building.

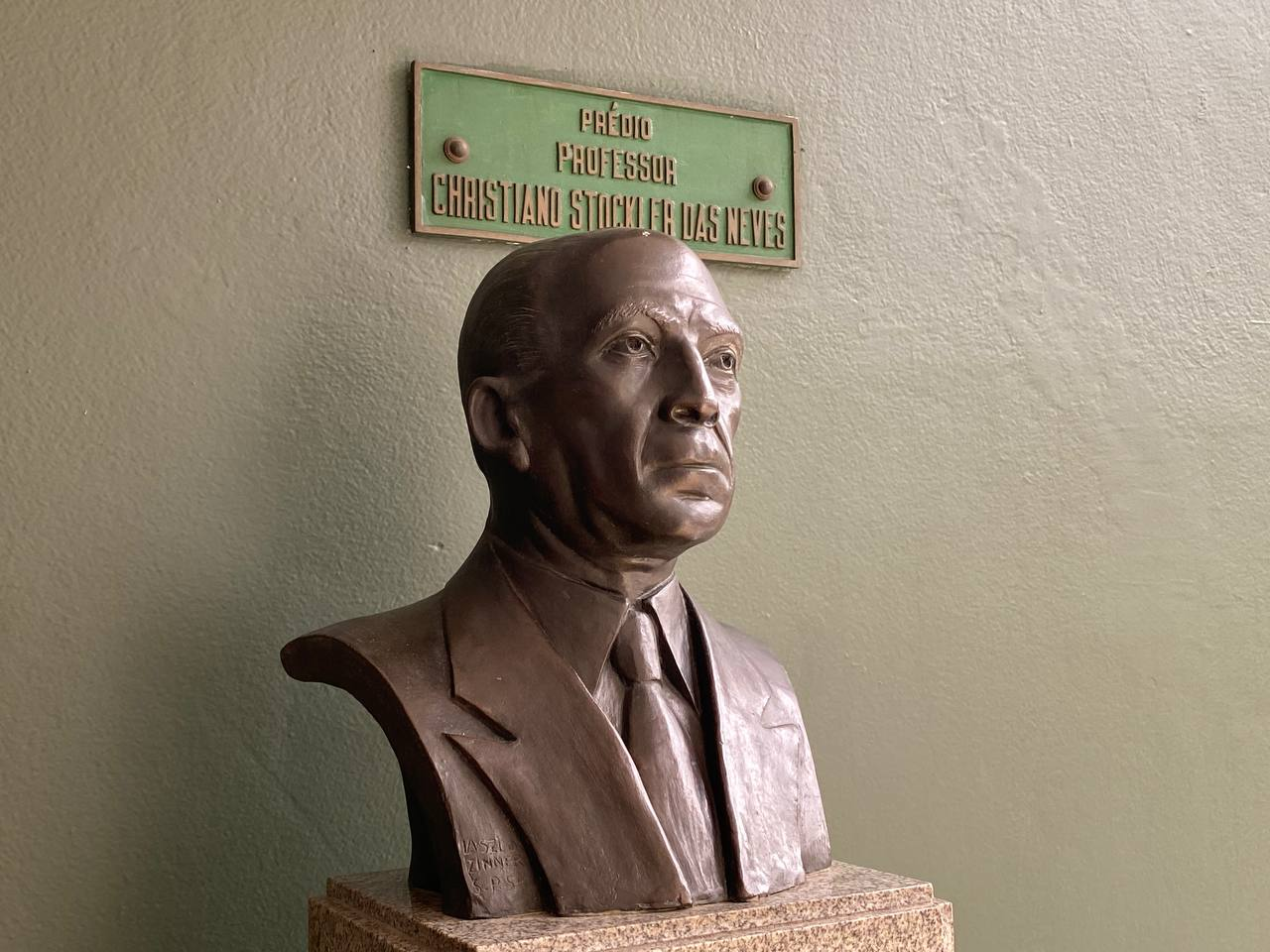
Christiano Stockler das Neves bust, founder of the Architecture and Urbanism School.

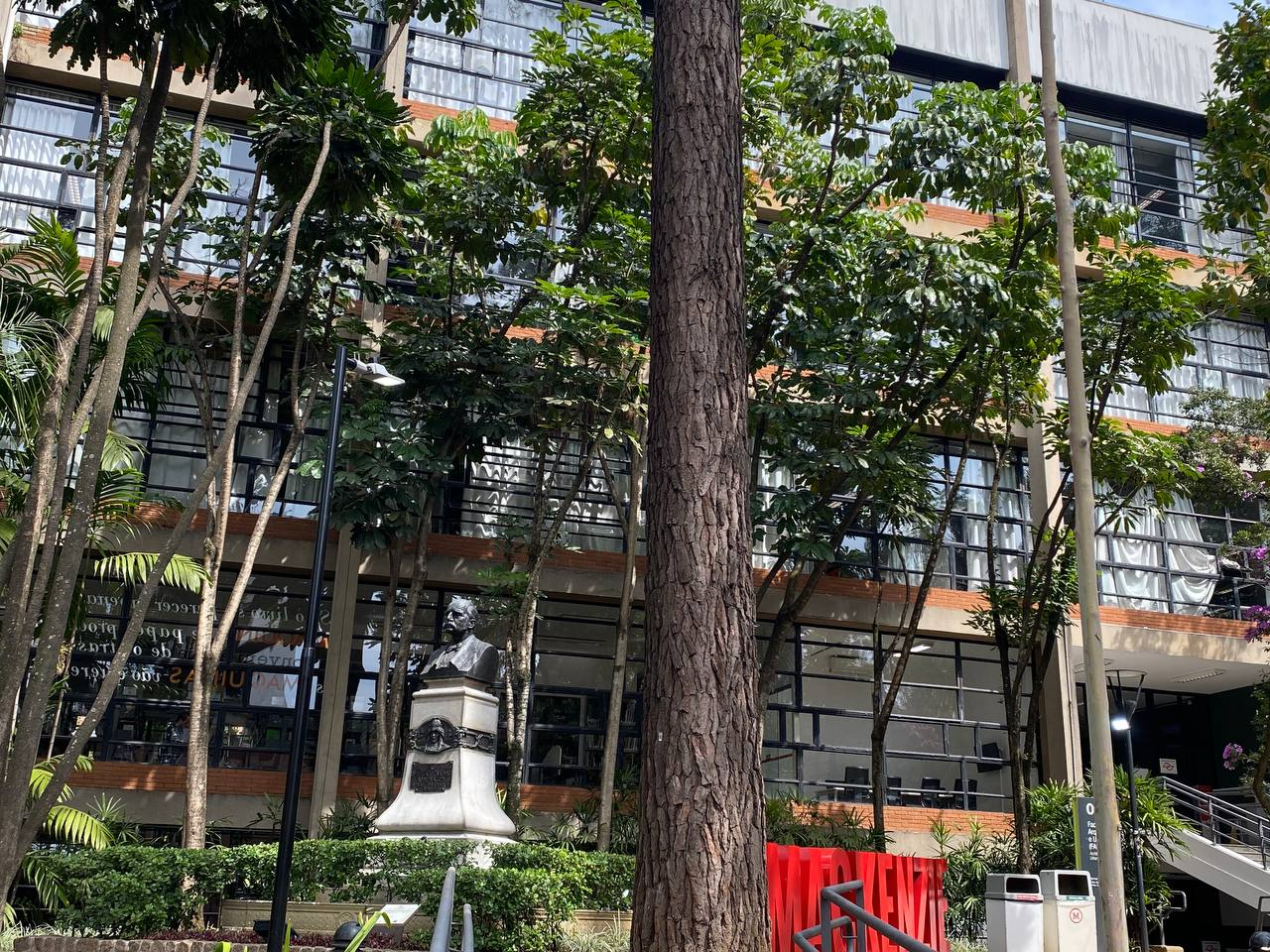
Fairy Forest, overlooking the School of Architecture.

=== Buildings ===
Due to the founders' origins and the Presbyterian faith's connection to their homeland, the university's historic buildings bear visible influence and elements of 19th-century American architecture. Among them, the proximity to Georgian architecture stands out, due to the predominant use of red brick on the exterior and Renaissance, Neoclassical, and Medieval-inspired ornaments, which are also part of the architectural identity of English and American universities, such as Harvard University, the University of Pennsylvania, and the University of Leeds.

The Higienópolis Campus is listed and recognized as a Historical and Cultural Heritage site by CONDEPHAAT (Council for the Defense of Historical, Archaeological, Artistic, and Tourist Heritage of the State of São Paulo). Intact since 1914, the university's woods house the bust of Horace Lane, who in 1884 was invited by Rev. Chamberlain to direct the American School.

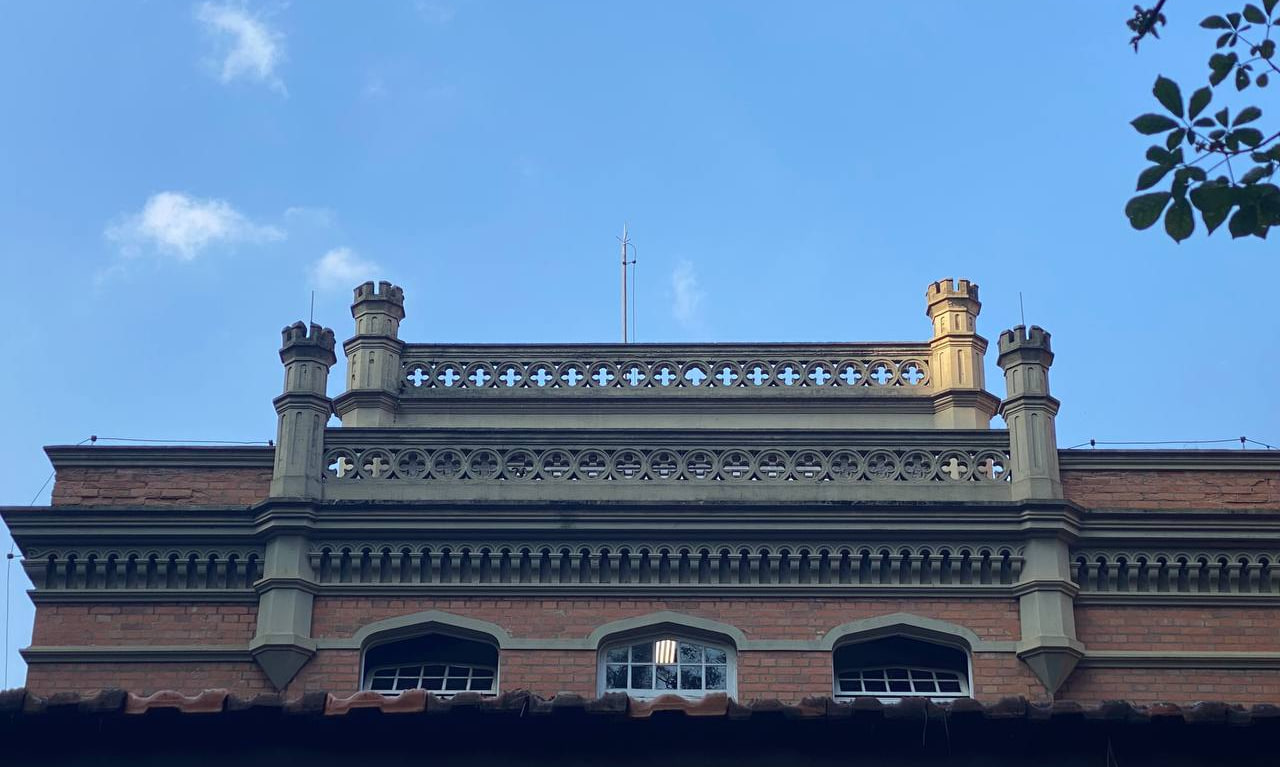
Architectural details of the George Alexander Library.

=== School of Engineering (EE) and School of Architecture and Urban Planning (FAU) ===
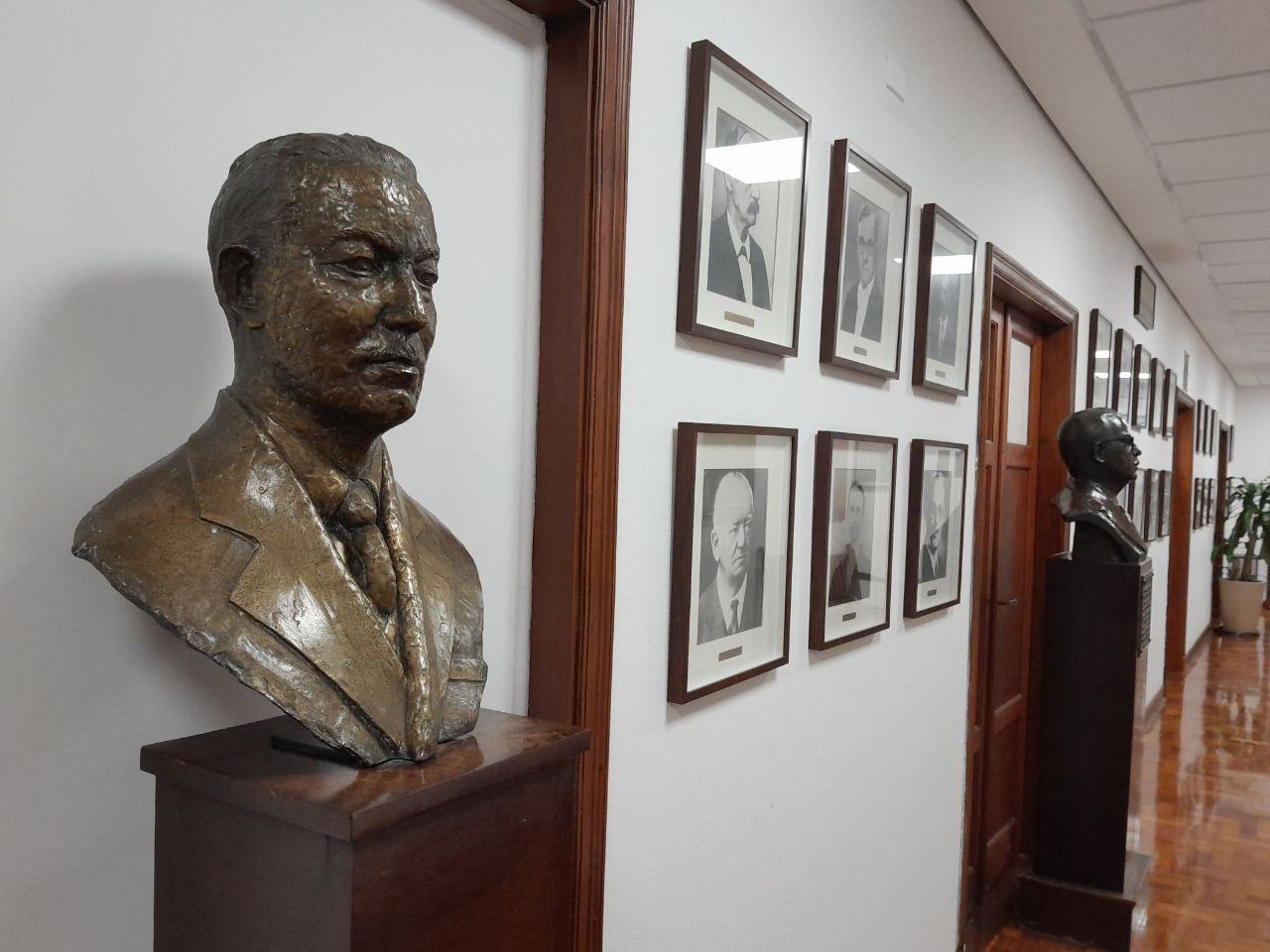
Busts of Henrique Pegado, founder of the School of Engineering.

In February 1896, the Mackenzie School of Engineering began its program, with diplomas still issued by New York University and the first private engineering school in Brazil. The institution offers degrees in electrical, mechanical, civil, materials, production, chemical, and computer engineering. It was also responsible for the country's first Chemical Engineering program. The school produced names that enriched national culture, such as Adolpho Lindenberg, founder of CAL, who transformed the landscape of São Paulo with neoclassical buildings whose "Lindenberg Building" brand became synonymous with charm and tradition in São Paulo's upscale neighborhoods. FAU was founded in 1917 by Cristiano Stockler das Neves, who has a bust in his honor at the university. It is one of the oldest and most traditional architecture schools in the country.

Both FAU and EE trained the architects of the Itália, Farol Santander, Mirante do Vale buildings and the reconstruction of Páteo do Colégio, cultural symbols of the city of São Paulo. In its 100th anniversary, EE was honored with the inauguration of the Mackenzie Engineering School Road Complex and the Mackenzie Engineering School Hydroelectric Plant. In Mackenzie's 150th anniversary, the Engenheiro Antonio Moliterno Viaduct was inaugurated, a graduate of EE where he was also a professor.

== Athletics ==
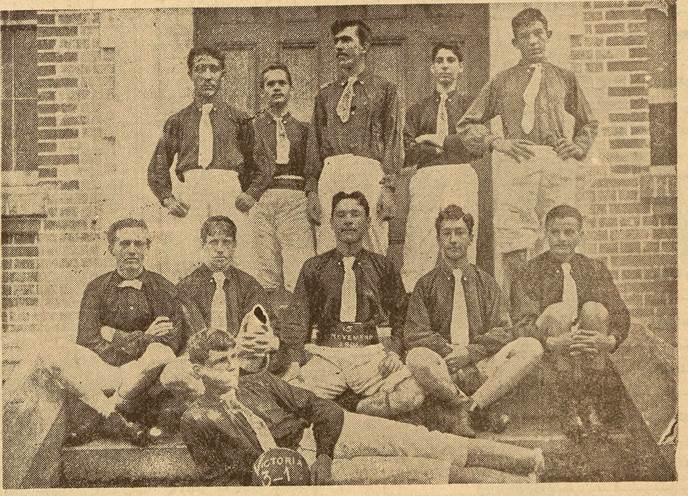
AA Mackenzie - Academic Champion of 1919.

In 1896, a teacher, Mr. Augustus Shaw, returned from the United States and began promoting sports such as basketball, football, and rugby. Many students became interested in these "amusements" and in 1898 they came together to found the Mackenzie College Athletic Association.

Among the founders of Mackenzie was Belfort Duarte. This Maranhão native, a student at the school, was the one who founded, in 1904, the America Football Club of Rio de Janeiro, and was also responsible for the fact that America had so many "clones" throughout Brazil. Even in São Paulo, Belfort Duarte would found an América FC in 1916 (which would later be called Tremembé FC). It was some Mackenzie students who introduced football to Santos and Sorocaba in 1902.

Among the club's greatest idols are Arthur Friedenreich, who played for Mackenzie between 1912 and 1913, and Manuel Nunes, also known as Neco.

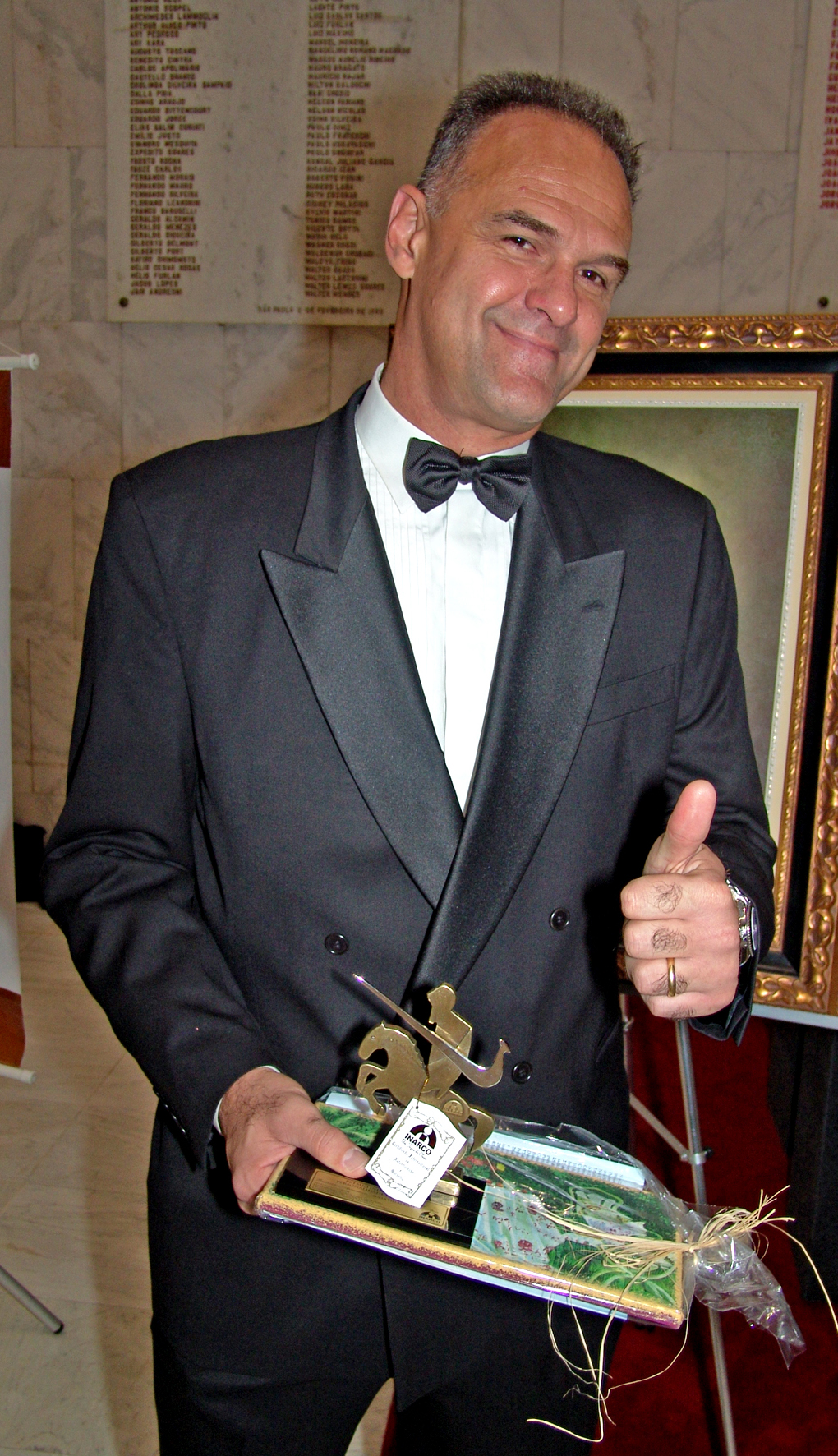
Oscar Schmidt, nicknamed Mão Santa (Holy Hand), He was considered to be the all-time leading scorer in the history of basketball.

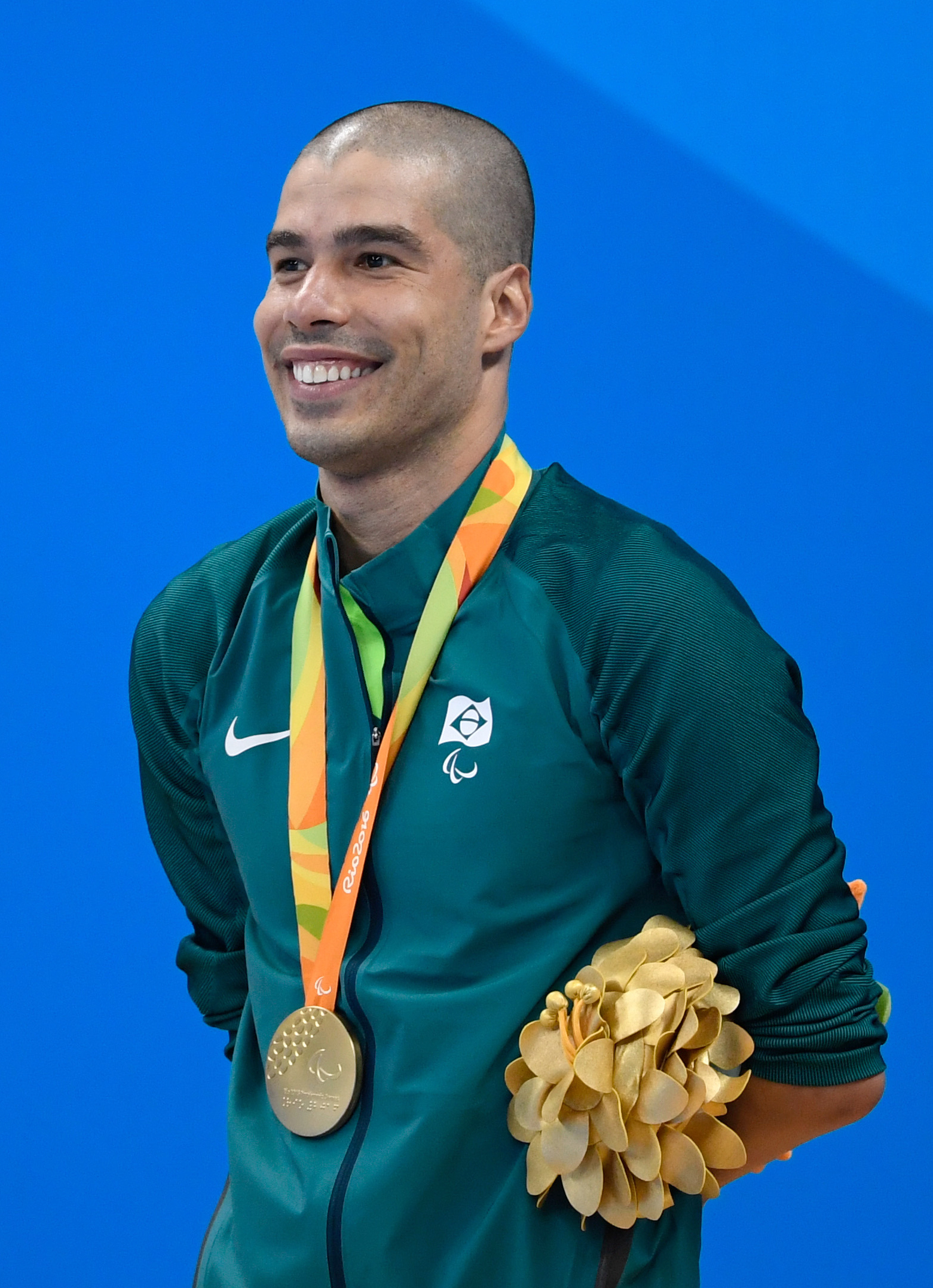
Daniel Dias, 14-time Paralympic Games gold medalist.

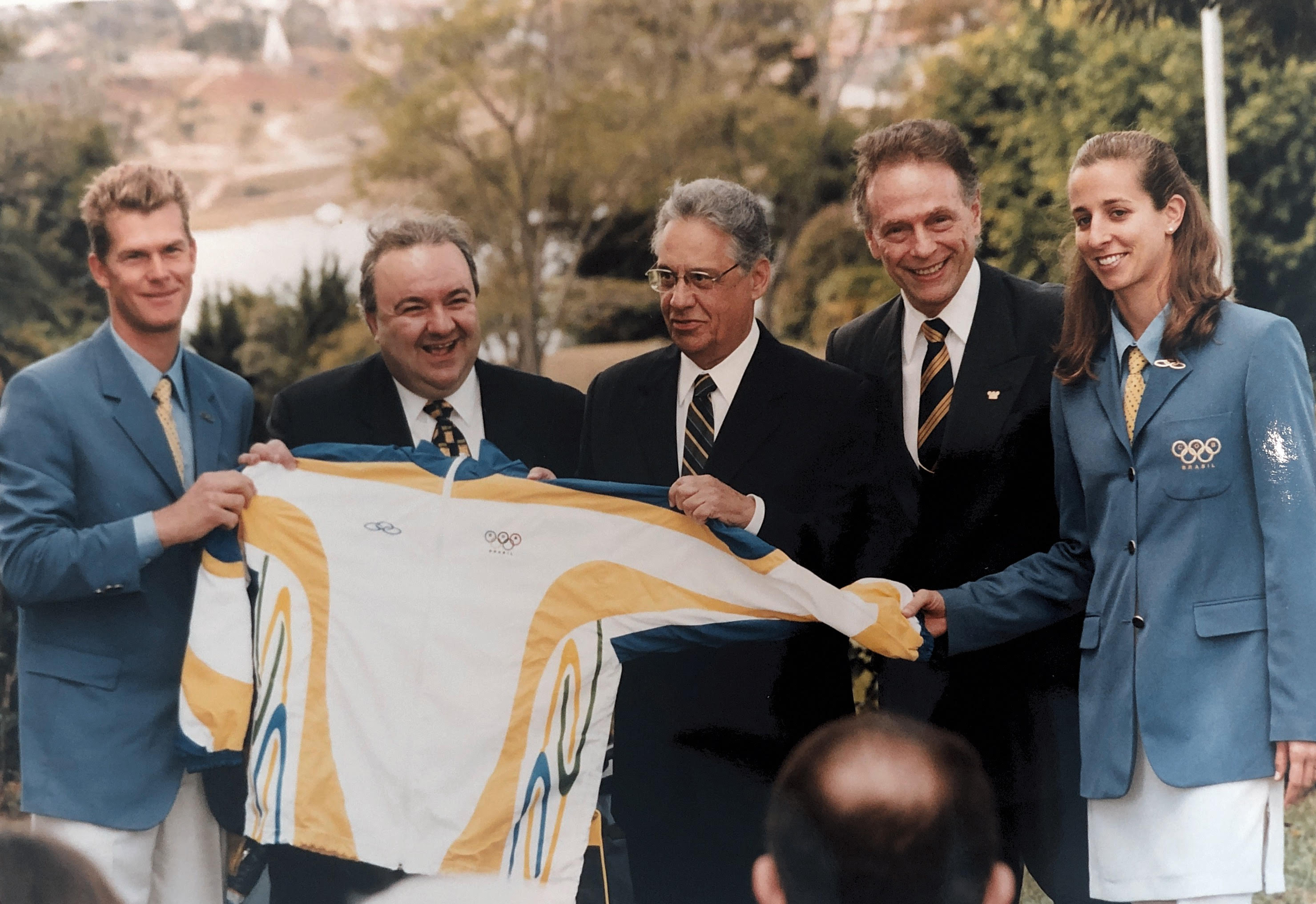
Robert Scheidt, widely considered to be one of the greatest sailors of all time.

Mackenzie was one of the founders of Brazil's first football league, the São Paulo Football League. On May 3, 1902, the first official match in the history of São Paulo and Brazilian football was played between Mackenzie and Germânia, with the team winning 2-1 with a goal by Mário Eppinghaus, one of the founders, who will forever be known as the scorer of the first official goal in Brazilian football.

Today, the institution maintains its sporting tradition through the Mackenzie National Team, which competes in the highest divisions of chess, badminton, fencing, water polo, track and field, swimming, judo, jiu-jitsu, taekwondo, tennis, table tennis, volleyball, basketball, handball, and futsal. The university offers scholarships to student athletes, including nationally acclaimed gold medalists Oscar Schmidt, Daniel Dias, and Robert Scheidt, considered the greatest athletes in Brazilian history in their respective sports.

== Scientific Production ==
=== MackGraphe ===
MackGraphe is the Graphene and Nanomaterials Research Center at Mackenzie Presbyterian University, which aims to master processes in all stages of technology development, from the modeling of nanomaterials to their application. MackGraphe expects to have a huge impact on society by developing new technologies to fulfil their needs.

It began operations in 2013 with a budget of approximately US$20,000,000.00, which included the construction of a new building (inaugurated on March 2, 2016, in the presence of Prof. Sir Andre Geim, 2010 Nobel Prize in Physics, with 7 floors plus 2 basement floors and a class 1,000 clean room with an area of approximately 200 m2. MackGrapghe is a “sister” center of the Centre for Advanced 2D Materials (CA2DM) at the National University of Singapore, acting in a complementary manner.

=== The Pierre Kaufmann Radio Observatory ===
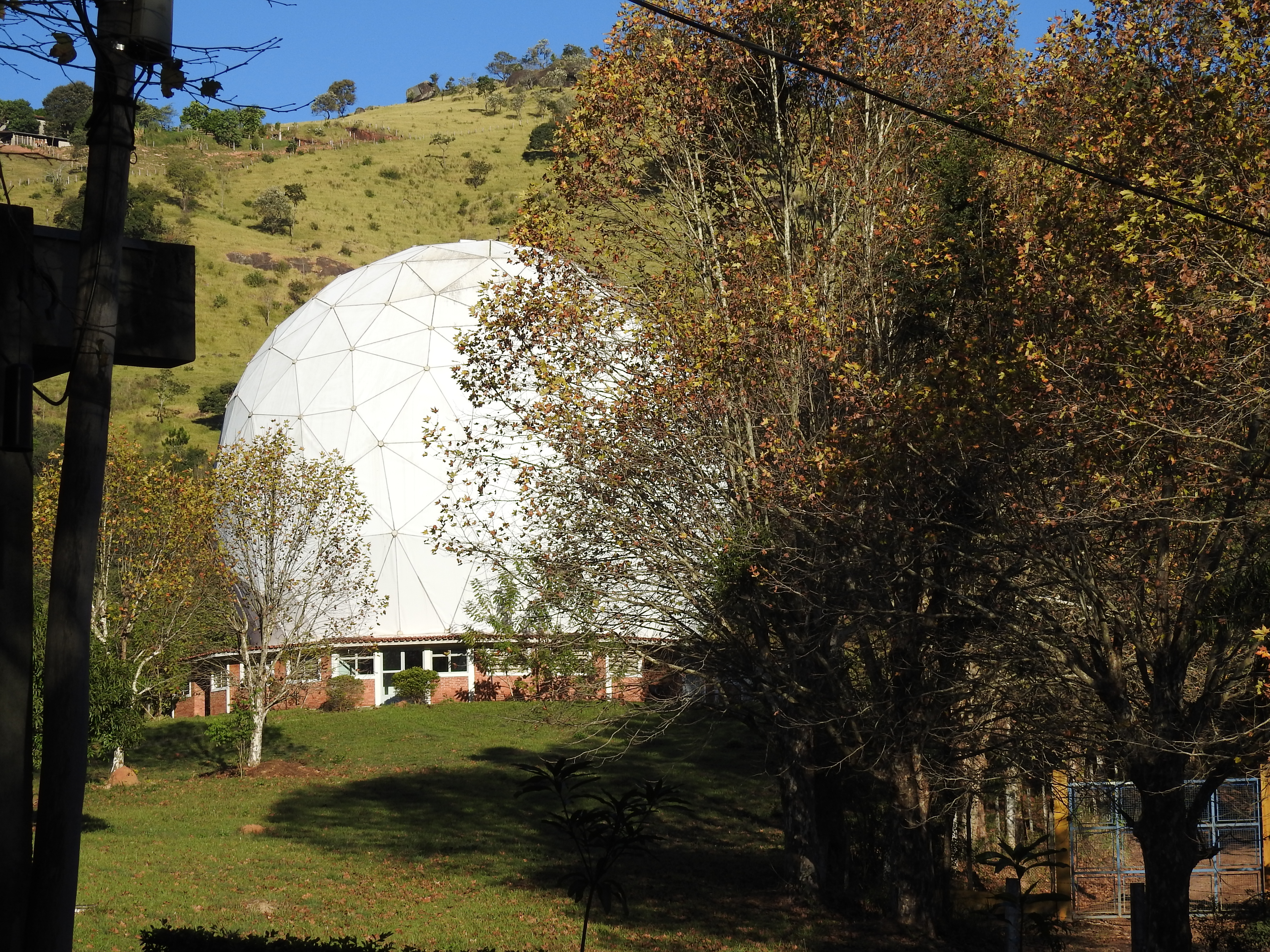
The Pierre Kaufmann Radio Observatory.

The Pierre Kaufmann Radio Observatory (ROPK) - formerly known as the Itapetinga Radio Observatory - was reopened this Tuesday, December 10, in Atibaia, in the São Paulo metropolitan area. The facility, which belongs to Mackenzie Presbyterian University (UPM), is operated with the participation of the National Institute for Space Research (INPE). Founded in 1970, the observatory was deactivated in 2014 after INPE was unable to maintain research and technical teams. In 2017, UPM decided to reopen the facility and honor the former coordinator of the Mackenzie Center for Radio Astronomy and Astrophysics (CRAAM), Professor Pierre Kaufmann, who founded the observatory.

== See also ==
- Universities and Higher Education in Brazil
