= Atlas (name) =

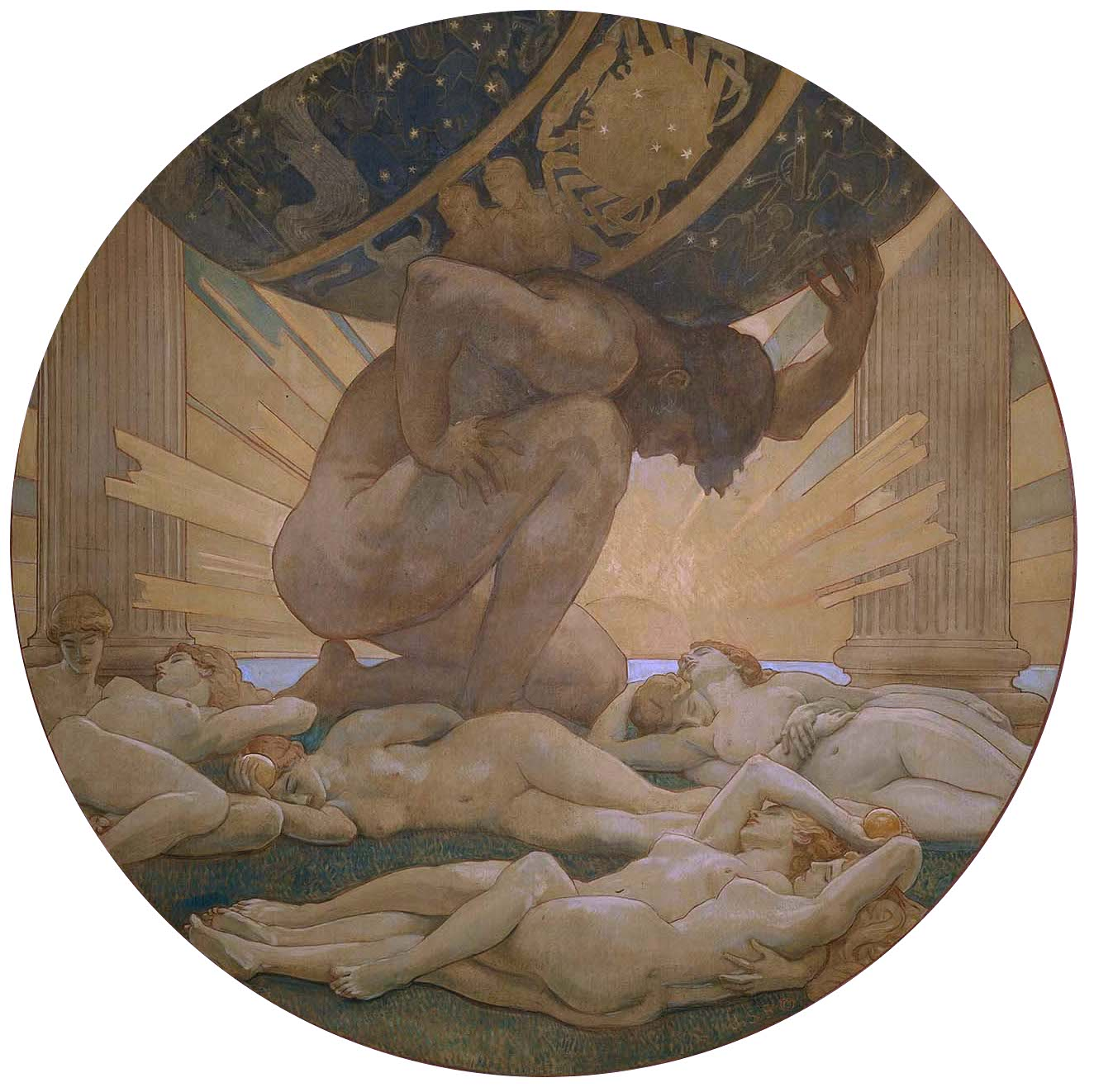
- Atlas and the Hesperides by John Singer Sargent
- Gender: Primarily male

Origin
- Origin: Greek
- Meaning: Name taken from Greek myth.

Atlas is a primarily male name, usually given in reference to the character from Greek mythology. It has increased in usage in recent years for both boys and girls in the United States along with other mythological names, but is still more used for boys. The name has also increased in usage for boys in the United Kingdom and Turkey. It is also a primarily Ashkenazi Jewish surname derived from an Arabic word meaning satin.

== People with the given name ==
- Atlas of Atlantis, first king of that mythological city
- Atlas of Mauretania, philosopher and astronomer after whom maps collections are named
- Atlas (graffiti artist), American graffiti artist
- Atlas DaBone, American wrestler and football player
- Atlas Saarikoski (born 1982), Finnish social activist, journalist and anarchist

== People with the surname ==
- Charles Atlas (1892–1972), Italian-American bodybuilder
- Charles Atlas (artist), American video artist and film director
- David Atlas (1924–2015), American meteorologist who pioneered weather radar
- Galit Atlas (born 1971), psychoanalyst
- James Atlas (1949–2019), American writer, editor and publisher
- Lauren Y. Atlas, American neuropsychologist
- Madeleine Atlas (born 1968), Swedish politician
- Mariam Atlas (1912–2006), Russian economist
- Meir Atlas (1848–1926), Lithuanian rabbi
- Natacha Atlas (born 1964), Belgian singer
- Nava Atlas, American book artist and author
- Omar Atlas (born 1938), Venezuelan professional wrestler
- Scott Atlas (born 1955), American conservative health care policy advisor
- Sol Atlas (1907–1973), American real estate developer
- Teddy Atlas (born 1956), American boxing trainer and commentator
- Tony Atlas (born 1954), American wrestler and bodybuilder
