= GURT =

GURT may refer to:

- Genetic Use Restriction Technology, proposed methods for restricting the use of genetically modified plants
- Giant Ukrainian Radio Telescope, a low-frequency radio telescope in Kharkiv oblast, Ukraine

== See also ==
- Gogurt
- Yogurt (disambiguation)
- Yurt (disambiguation)
