= Saarikoski =

Saarikoski is a Finnish surname. Notable people with the surname include:

- Atlas Saarikoski (born 1982), Finnish social activist, journalist and anarchist
- Felix Saarikoski (1857–1920), Finnish politician
- Pentti Saarikoski (1937–1983), Finnish poet and translator
- Timo Saarikoski (born 1969), Finnish ice hockey player
