= Voima =

Voima may refer to:

== Transport ==
- Two Finnish icebreakers:
  - Voima (1924)
  - Voima (1952)

== Publications ==
- Voima (newspaper), Finnish newspaper
- Nuori Voima, Finnish magazine published by Nuoren Voiman Liitto
- Pohjan Voima, newspaper of the Lapua Movement

== Companies ==
- Imatran Voima a Finnish state-owned power company, now part of Fortum
- Pohjolan Voima, a Finnish power company
- Teollisuuden Voima, a Finnish power company

== Others ==
- Imatran Voima (band), a Finnish electro music duo
- Voima (book), a fantasy fiction novel by C. Dale Brittain
