= Giant Ukrainian Radio Telescope =

Low frequency radio telescope in Kharkiv Oblast, Ukraine

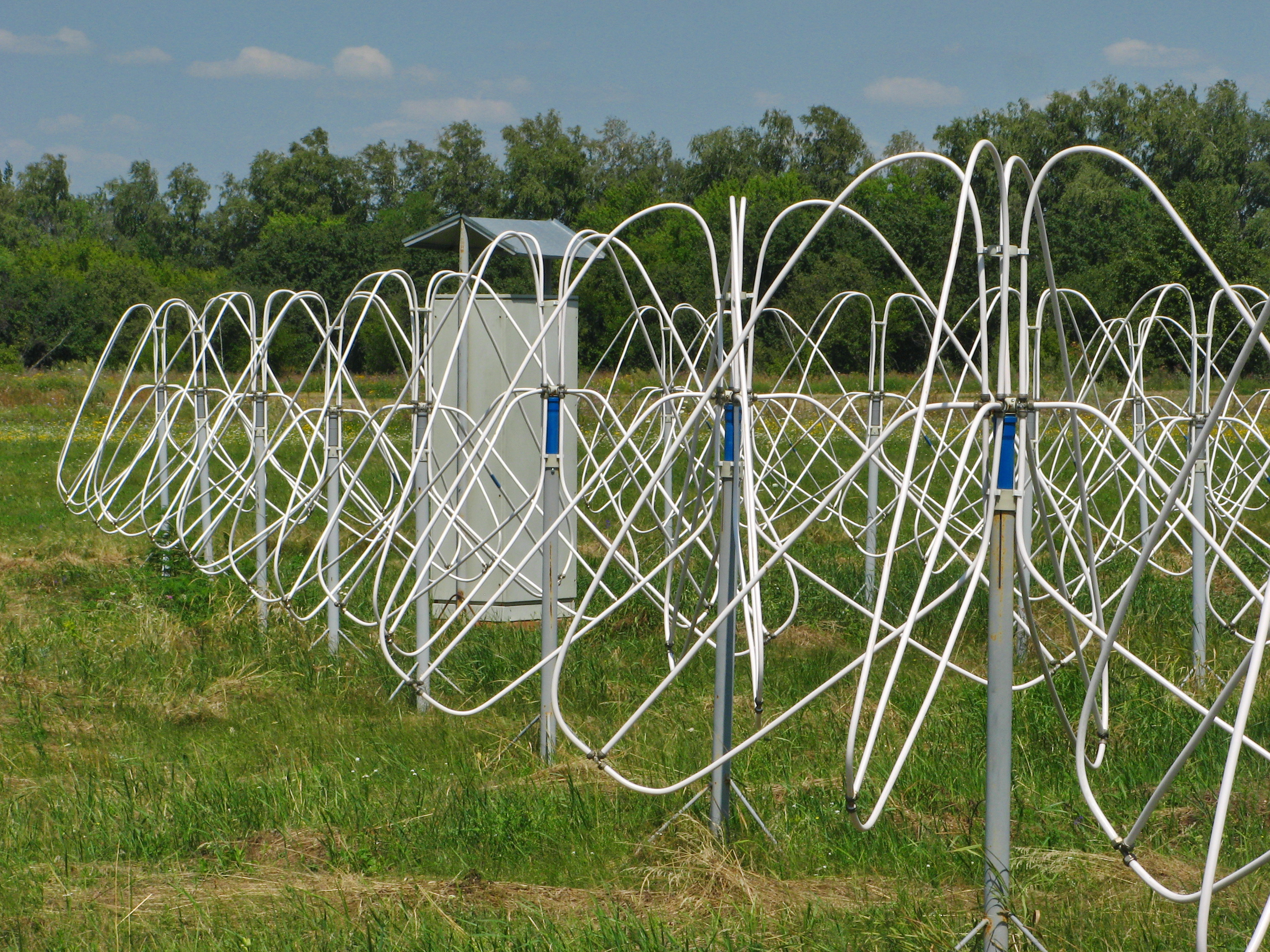

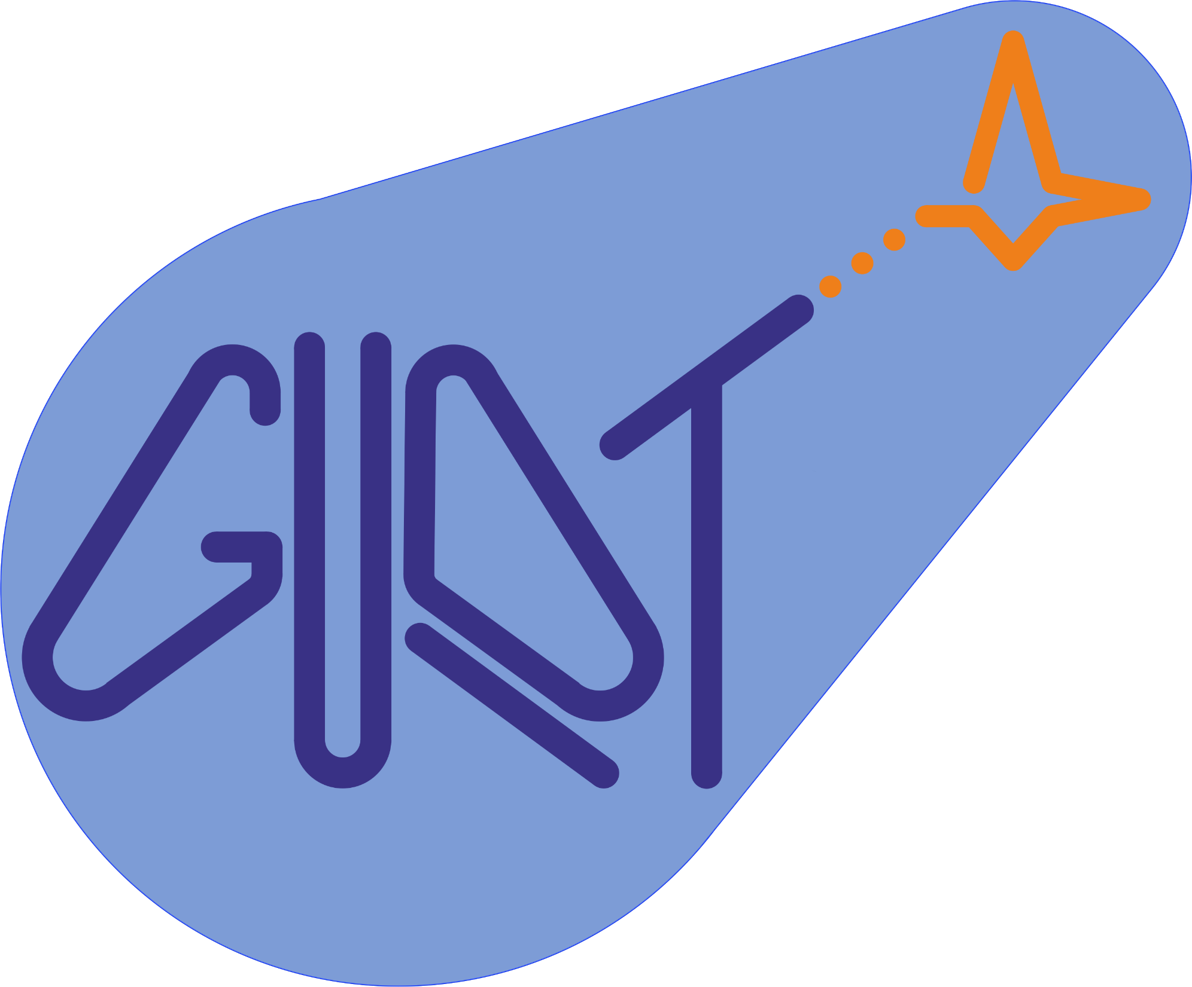
- Alternative names: GURT
- Location: Kharkiv Oblast, Ukraine
- Coordinates: 49°38′10″N 36°56′29″E
- Wavelength: 4.3 m (70 MHz)–37 m (8.1 MHz)
- Location within Ukraine
- Related media on Commons

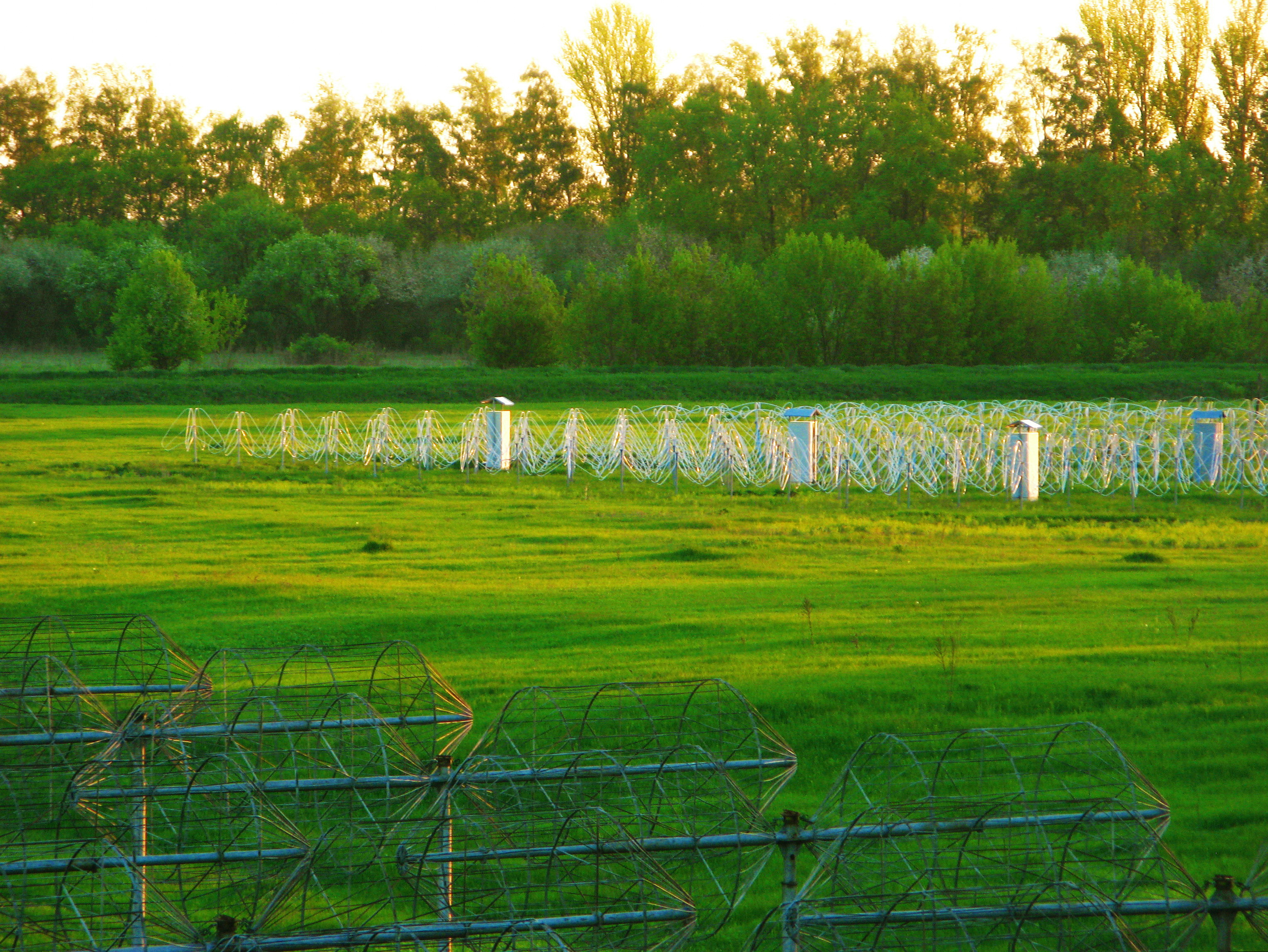
Cluster of GURT subarrays

Giant Ukrainian Radio Telescope (GURT, Ukrainian: Гігантський Український Радіотелескоп, ГУРТ) is a low frequency (8-80 MНz) radio telescope which is being developed, built and operated by Institute of Radio Astronomy of National Academy of Sciences of Ukraine (IRA NASU). It is located at S. Y. Braude radio astronomical observatory in Kharkiv oblast of Ukraine. The GURT system is designed to be an extension of Ukrainian T-shaped Radio telescope, second modification (UTR-2) in terms of spatial dimensions and frequency range. The goals of creating this new instrument include enhancement of UTR-2 functional properties and contribution to the progress of low frequency radio astronomy in synergy with other distant instruments.

== System overview ==
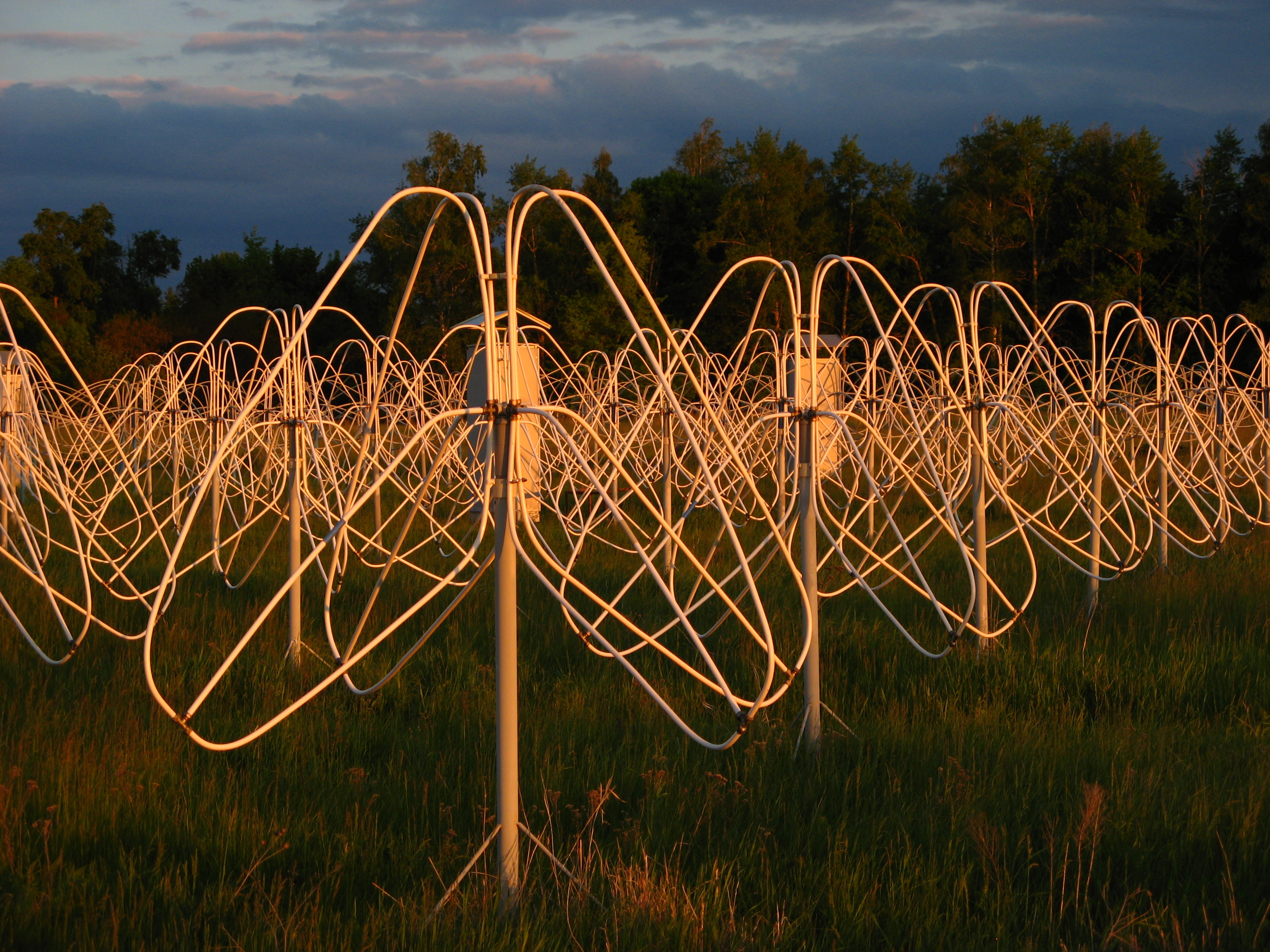
Active dipoles of low-frequency Giant Ukrainian Radio Telescope (GURT) phased array. Kharkiv oblast, Ukraine

GURT is a large phased array composed of identical subarrays consisting of 25 antenna elements. Subarrays are currently being added, with the finished array planned to incorporate 100 subarrays for a total of 2500 elements. The individual antenna element consists of two wideband dipoles of copper tubing at right angles to each other, at ±45° to the Earth's meridian, mounted 1.6 meters above the ground. The elements in a subarray are spaced 3.75 meters apart. The antenna elements of the two orthogonal polarizations are connected in separate identical phased arrays.

The crossed dipoles are grouped into square 5×5 subarrays. The subarray design provides a wide frequency coverage from 8 to 80 MHz, high sensitivity (the galactic background level exceeds their self-noise by more than 7 dB), and high RFI immunity (achieved due to high dynamic range of the dipole amplifier: input IP3 is 30 dBm). The effective area at the central frequency is about 350 m^{2}.

The phase shift network inside a subarray is analogue, consisting of different lengths of coaxial cable delay line switched into the signal path, whereas the phasing between subarrays is planned to be digital. The beamwidth (HPBW) of a single subarray beam at 40 MHz is about 20.4°. The estimate is consistent with the direct measurements that give 22±2°. The GURT subarray geometry provides a high filling factor that is important for a number of research tasks.

A powerful dedicated digital recorder for the GURT system has been developed at the IRA NASU. It is designed for spectral analysis of a band up to 80 MHz (at a sampling frequency of 160 MHz), with high spectral and temporal resolutions, high dynamic range and several operation modes including real time FFT, waveform recording, auto- and cross-correlation spectral measurements, addition and subtraction regime between the two input channels, normalization, and programmable signal delay.

== Current status ==
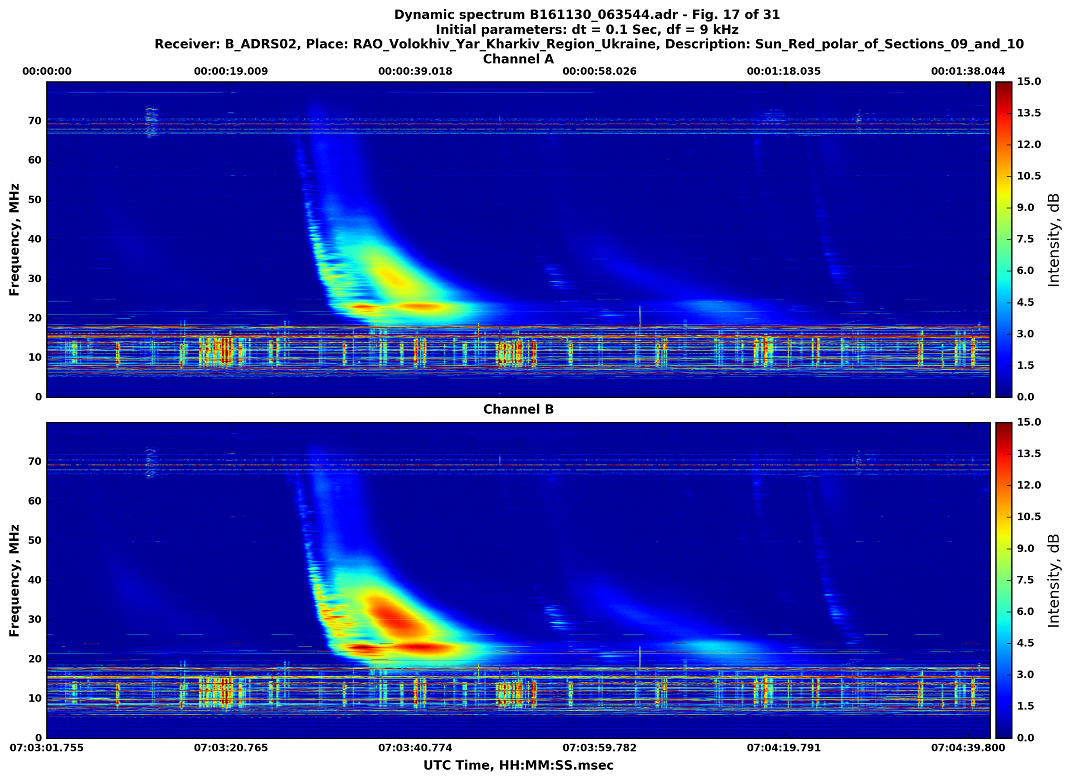
Dynamic spectra of solar bursts of type III and IIIb-III received with GURT subarrays #9 and #10 on November 30, 2016

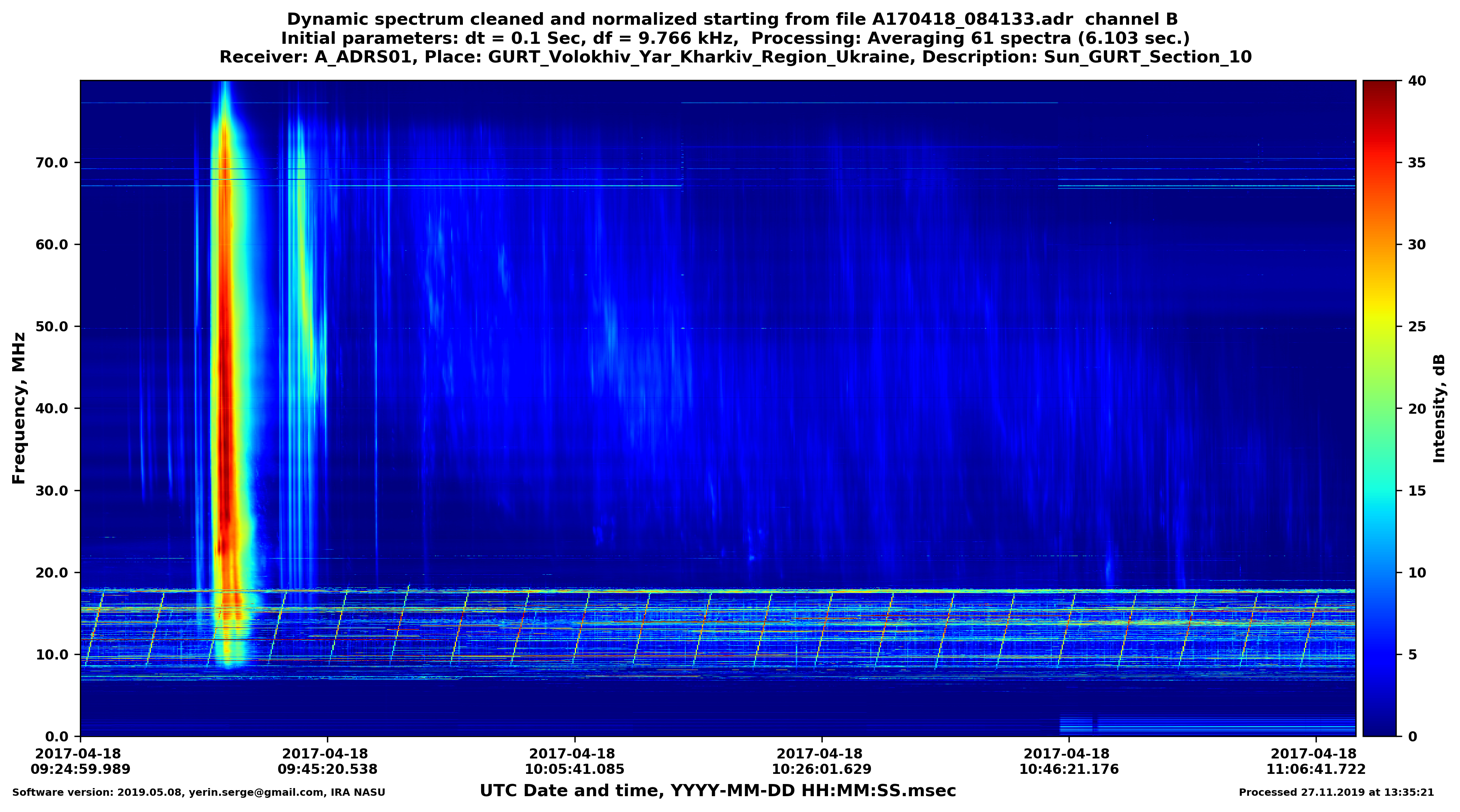
Dynamic spectra of a group of Type III bursts, Type II and Type IV bursts observed during solar coronal mass ejection on 2017 April 18 with GURT radio telescope subarray

Four GURT subarrays have already been installed, equipped, and are operational now. For now most of the time subarrays are used for radio astronomical observations separately because of limited resources for digital phasing system. It has been found that in spite of comparatively small effective area and sensitivity of the subarray it is possible to observe a number of important astrophysical phenomena in a wide frequency range (8–80 MHz). They have proven their ability to address many radio astronomical problems, e.g. for observations of solar bursts, Jovian Io-related decametric radiation, ionospheric scintillation, ground-based support for spacecraft missions, emission of pulsars, etc. The presence of large and well-studied UTR-2 at the same observatory opens vast opportunities in antenna testing in the shared frequency range. The sensitivity and other parameters of the GURT active antenna and subarray are studied using computer simulations and their results are verified with noise measurements.

== Future prospects ==
GURT, currently under construction, will consist of many (up to 100) identical subarrays. The available area of the S. Y. Braude observatory exceeds one square kilometer. Construction of new subarrays is successive, spanning over a period of time, as resources become available. With increase of number of subarrays and effective area the number of astrophysical problems to be solved by GURT will increase significantly. Joint simultaneous observations of radio astronomical sources with many instruments all over the world are very important at low frequencies due to many hindering factors. Various RFI conditions, different impact of ionosphere at the site of radio telescope, various configurations and parameters of distant radio telescopes increase significantly the informativity of received signals.
