= Yurt (disambiguation) =

Yurt is a portable dwelling of Asian nomads.

Yurt may also refer to:

- Dormitory (film), Turkish title: Yurt, a 2023 film
- Yurt (Cossack)
- Yurt, Turkic equivalent of Horde or Ulus
- Yurt, a series of novels by C. Dale Brittain

== See also ==
- Reed Green Coliseum, nicknamed The Yurt
