= Yogurt (disambiguation) =

Yogurt (alternatively spelled Yoghurt or Yogourt) is a dairy product.

Yogurt may also refer to:

== Arts, entertainment, and media ==
- Yogurt (band), former name of American punk band Hickey
- Yogurt, a major character in the film Spaceballs (1987)
- Yogurting, a 2005 video game

== Brands and enterprises ==
- Yogurt Mountain, a frozen yogurt chain
- Yogurtland, a California yogurt franchise

== Food ==
- Yogurt rice, an Indian dish
- Yogurt-kun, a San-X food
- Strained yogurt, a form of yogurt

== Other uses ==
- Yogurt Revolution, a 1988 rally to overthrow the government of Vojvodina and Kosovo

== See also ==
- Gogurt
