= Lauren Y. Atlas =

American neuropsychologist

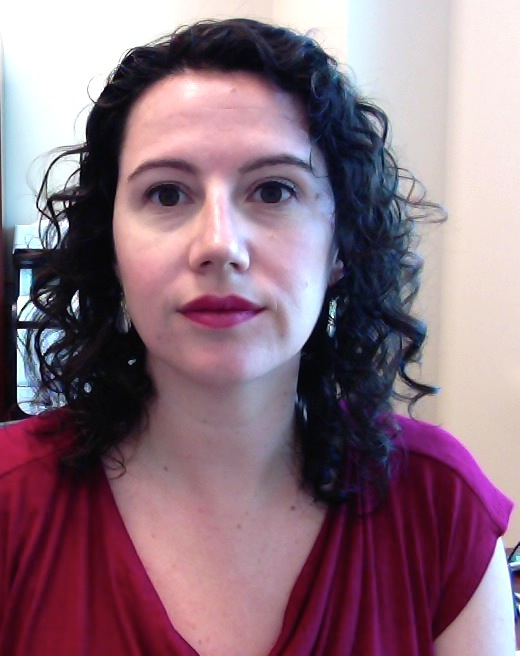
- Education: University of Chicago; Columbia University
- Scientific career
- Fields: Neuropsychology
- Workplaces: National Institutes of Health
- Doctoral advisor: Tor D. Wager

Lauren Y. Atlas is an American psychologist researching how expectations and learning influence pain and emotion, and how these factors influence clinical outcomes. She is a clinical investigator at the National Center for Complementary and Integrative Health and serves as the chief of the section on affective neuroscience and pain.

== Education ==
Atlas received her B.A. in psychology from the University of Chicago in 2003, and her Ph.D. in psychology in 2011 from Columbia University, where she studied under the mentorship of Tor D. Wager. Her doctoral work combined functional magnetic resonance imaging, experimental psychology, and psychopharmacology to examine the mechanisms by which beliefs and expectations influence pain and its modulation. Her dissertation, “Brain mechanisms of expectancy effects on pain experience,” was awarded with distinction. Atlas' postdoctoral research was conducted in Elizabeth A. Phelps' laboratory at New York University, where she extended computational models of decision-making to isolate components of expectancy, and to understand how these components influence physiological and neural markers of aversive learning.

== Career ==
In July 2014, Atlas joined the National Center for Complementary and Integrative Health (NCCIH) as an investigator and chief of the section on affective neuroscience and pain. She also holds joint appointments with the National Institute of Mental Health (NIMH) and the National Institute on Drug Abuse (NIDA). Her laboratory uses a multi-modal approach to investigate how expectations and learning influence pain and emotion, and how these factors influence clinical outcomes. Atlas' projects focus on dissociating components of expectancy (e.g., instructions vs. conditioning; stimulus vs. treatment expectancies), relating pain with other types of hedonic affective responses, and understanding social influences on pain (e.g. patient-provider interactions; health disparities). Long–term goals include revealing how specific features of the clinical context and interpersonal aspects influence patient outcomes, as well as determining whether expectancy–based processing is altered in specific patient populations.
