= Books-A-Million =

Bookstore chain

Books-A-Million Inc.

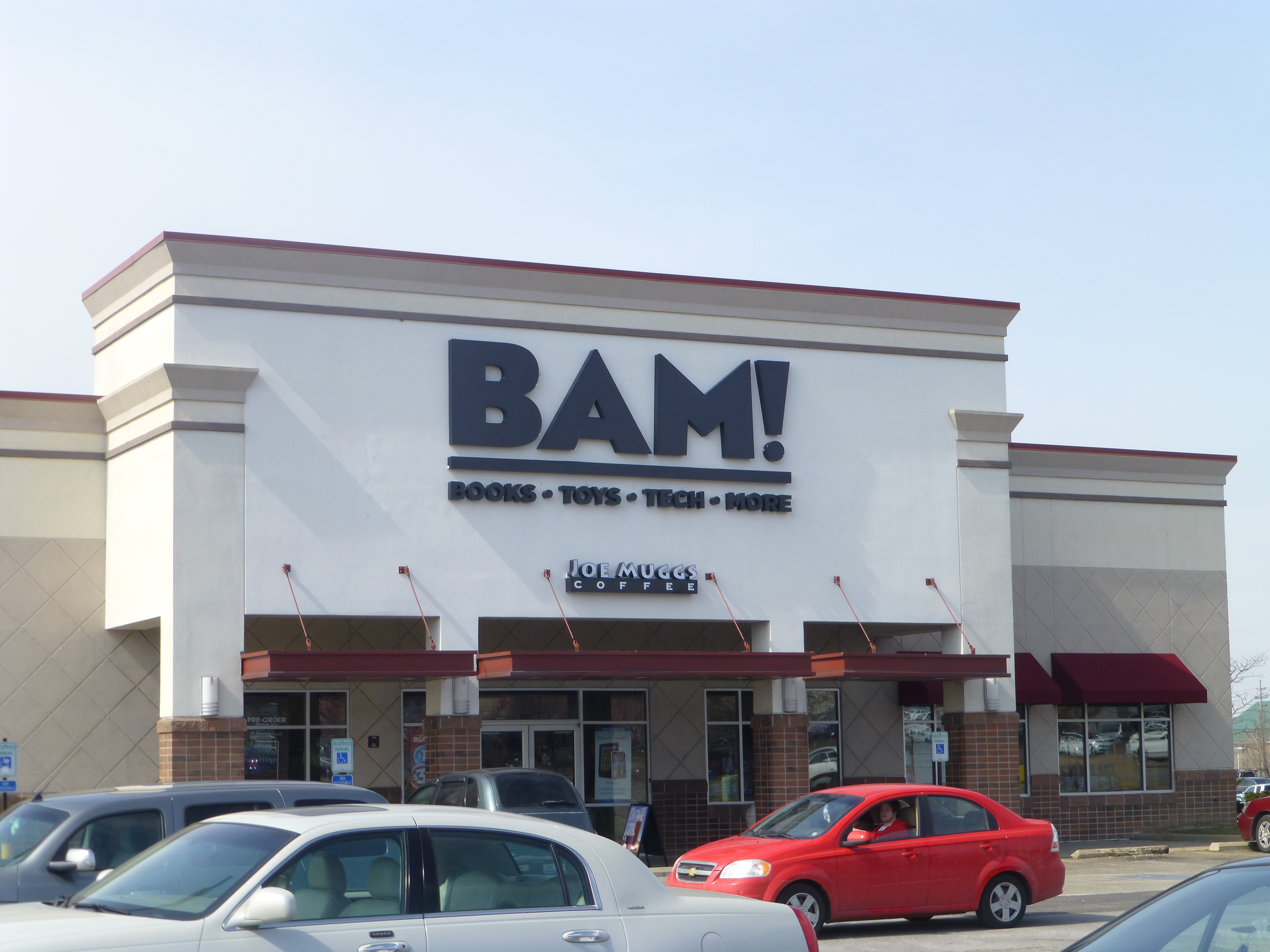
- A Books-A-Million store in Cuyahoga Falls, Ohio
- Type: Private (1917–1992 and 2015–present); Public (1992–2015)
- Industry: Retail; Entertainment
- Founded: 1917; 109 years ago in Florence, Alabama
- Founder: Clyde W. Anderson
- Headquarters: Birmingham, Alabama
- Number of locations: 260
- Key people: Clyde B. Anderson, Chairman; Terrance G. Finley, CEO & President; Damian Doggett, CFO
- Revenue: ▲$934 million (2022)
- Operating income: ▲$4.619 million (2014)
- Net income: ▲$2.908 million (2014)
- Total assets: ▼$294.251 million (2014)
- Total equity: ▲$113.264 million (2014)
- Owner: Anderson family (100%)
- Number of employees: 5,000 (2022)
- Subsidiaries: Yogurt Mountain (40%)
- Website: www.booksamillion.com

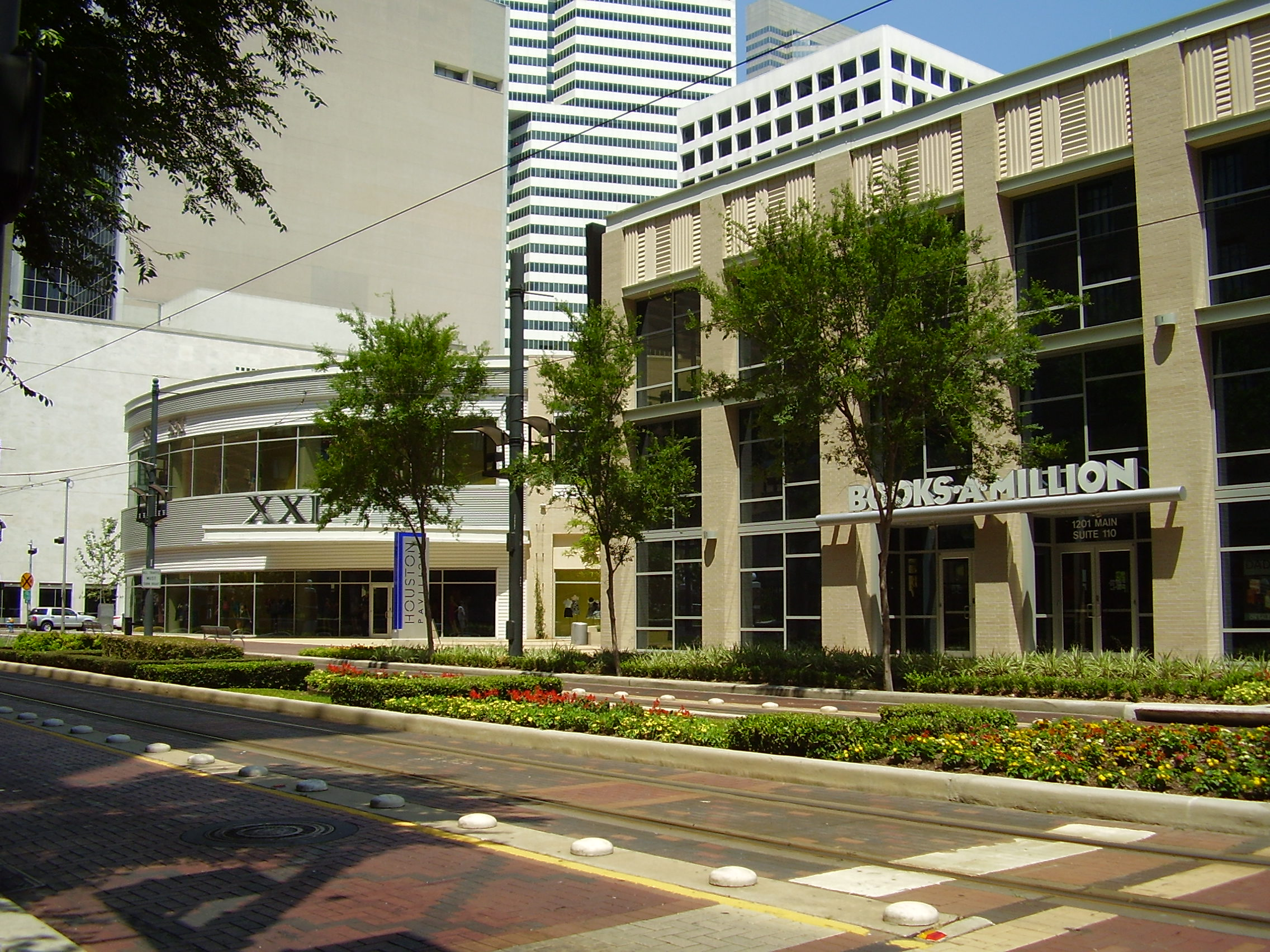
Books-A-Million in Houston Pavilions, Downtown Houston

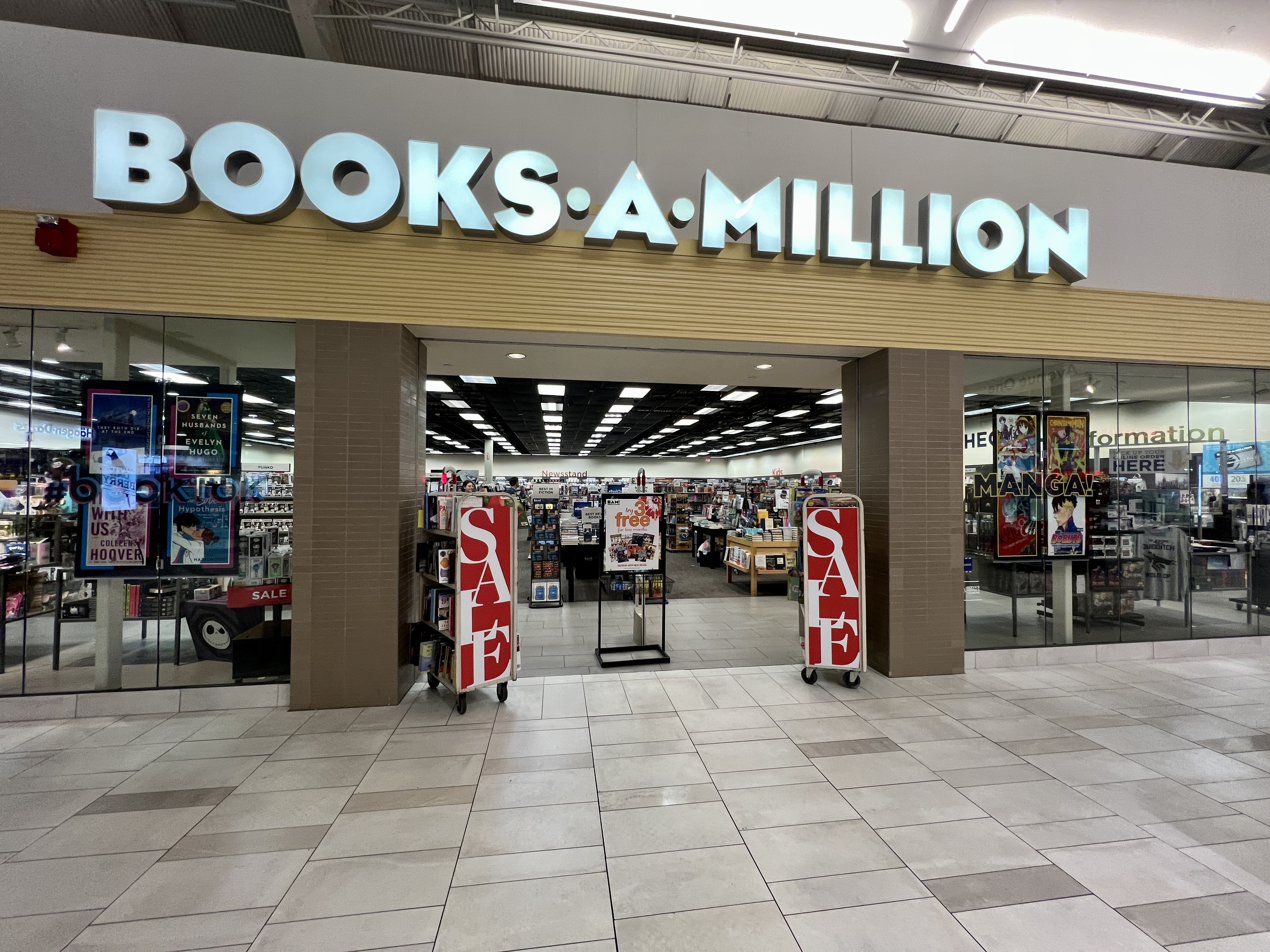
The Books-A-Million store at Sawgrass Mills, Sunrise, Florida

Books-A-Million, Inc., also known as BAM!, is a bookstore chain in the United States, operating 260 stores in 32 states. Stores range in size from 4,000 to 30,000 square feet and sell books, magazines, manga, collectibles, toys, technology, and gifts. Most Books-A-Million stores feature "Joe Muggs" cafés, a coffee and espresso bar. Stores operate under the names Books-A-Million, Bookland, Books & Company, and 2nd & Charles.

The company owns Yogurt Mountain Holding, a frozen yogurt retailer and franchisor with 40 locations, as well as Preferred Growth Properties, which develops and manages commercial real estate investments. It owns and operates American Wholesale Book Company (AWBC), an e-commerce division operating as booksamillion.com; and an internet development and services company, NetCentral, in Nashville, Tennessee.

In December 2015, the company was acquired by its chairman, Clyde B. Anderson, and his family, for $21 million.

== History ==
Books-A-Million was founded in 1917 in Florence, Alabama, as a newsstand by 14-year old Clyde W. Anderson, who dropped out of school to support his family after his father died. Anderson saw a business opportunity after workers on the nearby Wilson Dam complained that they could not get their hometown newspapers.

In 1950, Charles C. Anderson, the founder's son, inherited the store and expanded it into a chain. The company incorporated as Bookland in 1964.

By 1980, the company had 50 stores.

In 1988, Bookland acquired the Gateway Books retail chain based in Knoxville, Tennessee. The same year, the company opened its first superstore format store.

In 1992, the company changed its name to Books-A-Million, Inc. and became a public company via an initial public offering of 2.6 million shares at a price of $13 per share.

In 1998, the company launched its website, booksamillion.com.

On November 25, 1998, during the dot-com bubble, the stock price soared from $3 per share to $38.94 on November 27, 1998, and an intra-day high of $47.00 on November 30, 1998, after the company announced an updated website. Two weeks later, the share price was back down to $10. By 2000, the share price had returned to $3. Those days included suspenseful times on the company share market, such as when the stock moved up 6 points in 13 minutes. During this time, insiders sold hundreds of thousands of shares.

In 1999, the company acquired NetCentral, the designer of its website, and began operating American Wholesale Book Company, a book wholesaler and distributor.

In April 2010, the company paid $3 million for a 40% stake in Yogurt Mountain, a frozen yogurt retailer and franchisor. Six months later, the company opened Yogurt Mountain locations in its bookstores.

In September 2010, the company launched 2nd & Charles, a trader of used media, with its first store in Hoover, Alabama across from Riverchase Galleria.

In December 2015, the company was acquired by its chairman, Clyde B. Anderson, and his family, for $21 million, taking the company private and delisting its shares from the Nasdaq.

In November 2016, the company began to sell self-published books.

== See also ==
- Barnes & Noble
- Borders
