= Atlas Saarikoski =

- Born: Akuliina Saarikoski, until 2011; 1982 (age 43–44); Hyrylä
- Occupation: Journalist
- Years active: 2000–present
- Known for: Civil rights activism

Atlas Saarikoski (born Akuliina Saarikoski, 1982) is a Finnish social activist, journalist and anarchist.

== Career ==
Saarikoski has been involved in various civil rights movements, and has taken part in debates on immigration, animal rights, anarchism, feminism and sexual politics. Saarikoski has written for the Green left Voima newspaper. She is the editor-in-chief of the feminist magazine Tulva.

== Viewpoints ==
Saarikoski has criticized the Tahdon2013 citizens' initiative, and argued that gay marriage is a bad political goal. She has argued that gay marriage is shaping into an endpoint for gay rights. She has stated that marriage is based on heteronormativity and norms concerning the nuclear family in addition to strengthening gender-based power relations, and marriage can not be taken apart from the history of racial hygiene and chastity. Saarikoski has also criticized FEMEN for its anti-Islamic stance. Saarikoski supports separate physical education classes for boys and girls in Finland. She is a pacifist.

== See also ==
- Seta (organization)
- Anarchism and issues related to love and sex
