= URAN =

Ukrainian Radio Interferometer of NASU
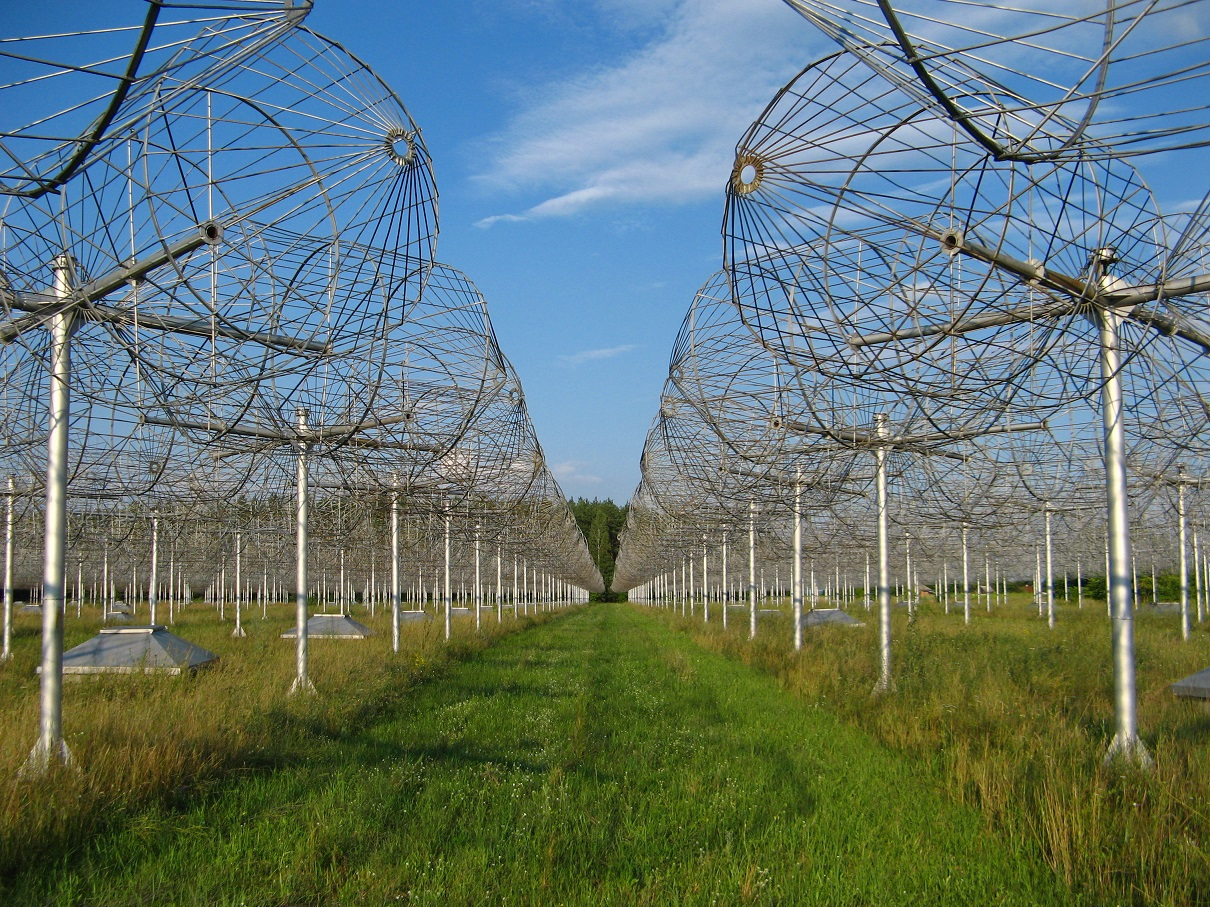
- Antenna array of the URAN-2 low-frequency radio telescope.
- Alternative names: URAN
- Organization: Institute of Radio Astronomy of the National Academy of Sciences of Ukraine
- Location: Ukraine
- Coordinates: 49°38′17″N 36°56′10″E
- Telescopes: Ukrainian T-shaped Radio telescope, second modification
- Location of URAN

URAN (Ukrainian Radio Interferometer of NASU) (Ukrainian: Український Радіоіонтеферометр Академії Наук - УРАН) is an array of radio-telescopes, spread across Ukraine and used for long-baseline interferometry in the 8–40 MHz range. The most sensitive of the telescopes is UTR-2. URAN-1 was built in 1975 in Zmiiv, Kharkiv oblast. URAN-2 was constructed starting in 1979 in Stepanivka village near Poltava. URAN-3 is near Shatsk, in the north-west, near the border with Poland and Belarus. URAN-4 was built in 1975 and is in the south-west, west of Odesa, by the Moldovan border.

Auxiliary telescopes are: URAN-1, with 96 dipoles in a 178 by 28 metres (584 ft × 92 ft) array; URAN-2, with 512 dipoles in a 238 by 118 metres (781 ft × 387 ft) array; URAN-3, with 256 dipoles in a 238 by 58 metres (781 ft × 190 ft) array; and URAN-4, with 128 dipoles in a 238 by 28 metres (781 ft × 92 ft) array. Because of the small number of baselines, images from URAN tend to be produced by model-fitting to sums of Gaussians rather than by direct synthesis.

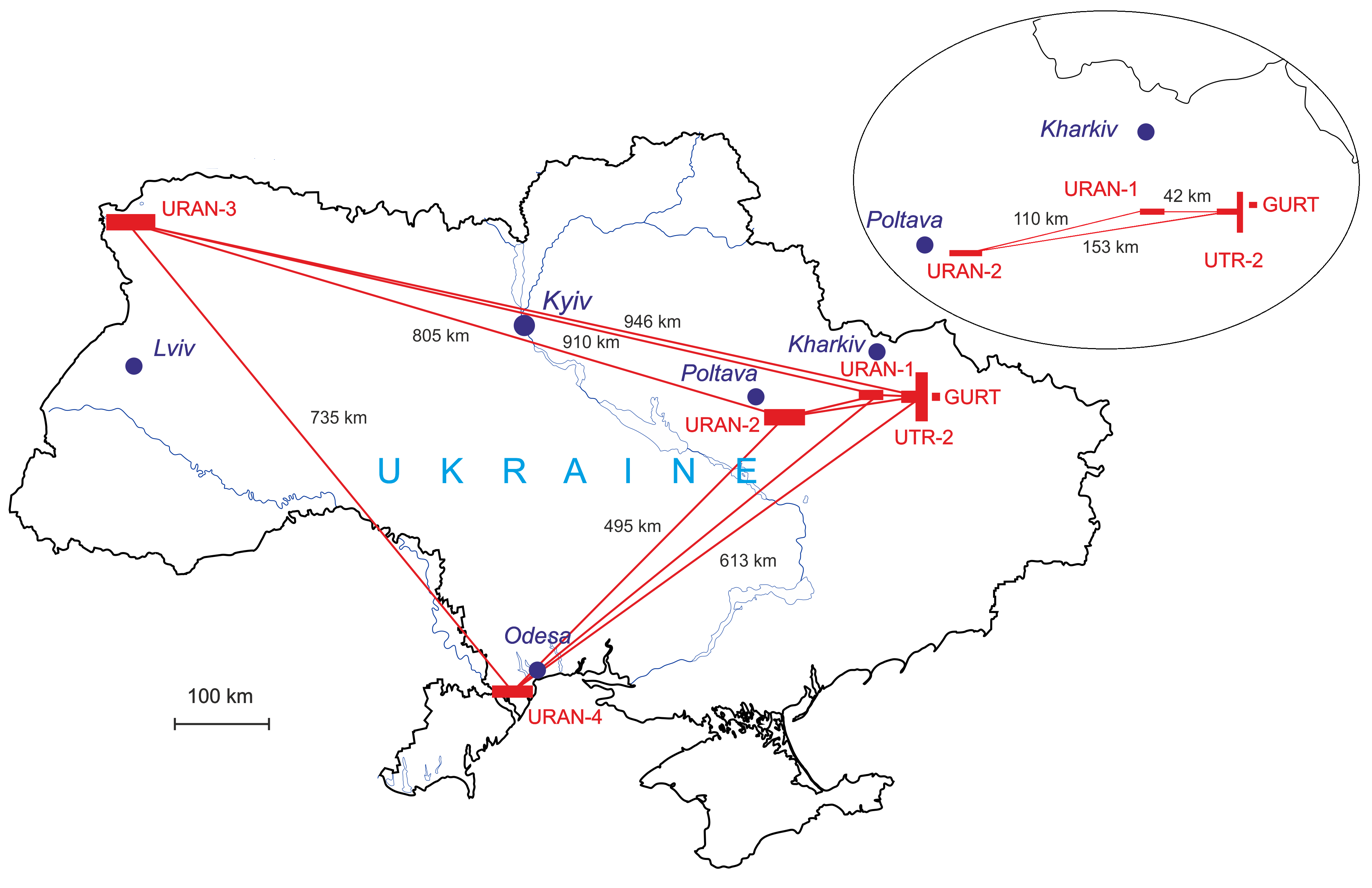
URAN low-frequency VLBI system, UTR-2 and GURT radio telescopes on the map of Ukraine.

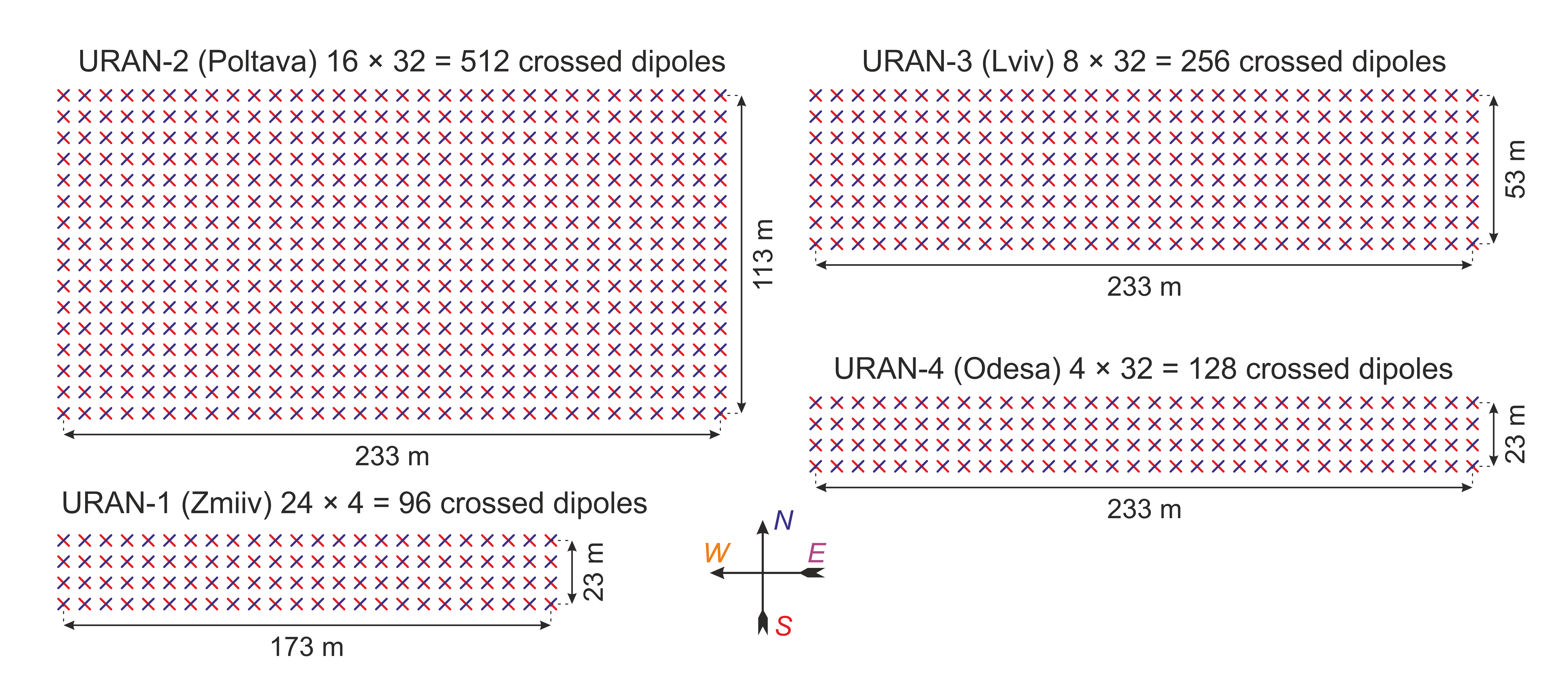
Geometrical configurations of the individual dipole antennas of the four URAN radio telescopes
