= A Bad Spell in Yurt =

1991 novel by C. Dale Brittain

- Author: C. Dale Brittain
- Cover artist: Tom Kidd
- Language: English
- Series: Royal Wizard of Yurt
- Genre: Fantasy novel
- Published: 1991 (Baen Books)
- Publication place: United States
- Media type: Print (paperback)
- Pages: 314 (first edition, paperback)
- ISBN: 978-0-671-72075-9 (first edition, paperback)
- OCLC: 24081446
- Followed by: The Wood Nymph and the Cranky Saint

A Bad Spell in Yurt is a fantasy novel by C. Dale Brittain first published in 1991. It takes place in the fictional kingdom of Yurt where Daimbert, a wizard who has just graduated from the wizards' school, takes up his post as the new Royal Wizard.

Daimbert's story is continued in The Wood Nymph and the Cranky Saint, Mage Quest, The Witch and the Cathedral, Daughter of Magic, and Is This Apocalypse Necessary?.

== Synopsis ==
The story takes place in the tiny kingdom of Yurt. It reads like a charming, light-hearted story at first, but darker forces soon reveal themselves.

Amongst themselves, the characters refer to the "three that rule the world", the aristocracy, the church, and wizardry. Though the aristocracy do the actual ruling, organized wizardry generally considers itself to be the superior of the three, in part because they put an end to the "Black Wars," wars between kingdoms so violent and bloody that individual wizards were forced to band together to stop them. Churchmen considers themselves superior to wizards, and they are traditional rivals in this semi-medieval world.

The first-person narrator is Daimbert, who has just barely graduated from the wizards' school. He takes up his first post as Royal Wizard of Yurt. Daimbert barely graduated, owing to all that embarrassment with the frogs, yet he has amazing improvisational skills that manage to get him by.

Daimbert soon befriends Joachim, the castle chaplain, attempts to make magical telephones from scratch, learns old herbal magic from his predecessor, fights a dragon from the northern land of wild magic, searches for the source of an evil spell on the king, and is forced to bargain with a demon.

Here, magic is a wild force of four dimensions that is shaped by a wizard's spells or potions, and (usually) is spoken aloud using the Hidden Language, needed to channel magic for the means of a spell. However, wizards can also choose to sell their soul to a demon in return for supernatural powers. The book reads somewhat like a mystery, where Daimbert follows up on many clues throughout the story, eventually suspecting everyone in the castle. The caster of the evil spell is not revealed until the end of the book.

== Important characters ==
- Daimbert, main character and Royal Wizard of Yurt
- Joachim, the royal chaplain
- Prince Dominic, the king's nephew
- Lady Maria, the queen's aunt
- Zahlfast, second in command at the wizards' school
- Haimeric, the King of Yurt
- The Queen of Yurt, never named
- Daimbert's predecessor as wizard of Yurt, never named
