= Yogurt Mountain =

Franchises of yogurt chains in the southeast

Yogurt Mountain Franchising LLC
- Founded: September 2009 (Birmingham, Alabama)
- Founders: Aaron Greenberg; David Kahn
- Headquarters: Birmingham, Alabama, United States
- Owner: Books-A-Million (40%)
- Website: yogurtmountain.com

Yogurt Mountain Franchising LLC, founded by David Kahn and Aaron Greenberg, is a chain of self-serve frozen yogurt dessert bars with 16 rotating flavors of frozen yogurt and over fifty toppings, for which the customer pays by the ounce.

== History ==
The company opened their first store in Birmingham, Alabama in September 2009. From its base in Birmingham, Yogurt Mountain has expanded into 40+ stores across the southeast. In April 2010, bookstore chain Books-A-Million paid $3 million for shares in Yogurt Mountain. Soon after, in October 2010, Yogurt Mountain locations began appearing inside Books-A-Million superstores, beginning in Lakeland, Florida.

== See also ==
- List of frozen yogurt companies
