= Nava Atlas =

American artist

- Education: University of Michigan, B.F.A. State University of New York at New Paltz, M.A.
- Occupations: Vegetarian, Vegan, Plant-Based Cookbook Author and Blogger; Fine Artist

Nava Atlas is an American Vegan/Plant-based cookbook author and blogger (The Vegan Atlas), and fine artist.

== Education ==
Nava Atlas received her B.F.A. degree from the University of Michigan in 1977, and her M.A. degree in Art Studio in 2007 from the State University of New York at New Paltz.

== Career ==
=== Cookbooks ===
Atlas was originally known as a creator of vegetarian recipes and cookbooks. Her first cookbook, Vegetariana, came out in 1984, and an entirely vegan edition of Vegetariana was released in 2021. Additional works include: The WholeFood Catalog: A complete Guide to Natural Foods (1988), American Harvest: Regional Recipes for the Vegetarian Kitchen (1991), Great American Vegetarian (1998), The Vegetarian 5- Ingredient Gourmet (2001), and The Vegetarian Family Cookbook (2004).

Later, Atlas transitioned to vegan and plant-based cookbooks: Vegan Holiday Kitchen (2011), Wild About Greens (2012), Plant Power (2014), 5-Ingredient Vegan (2019), Vegan on a Budget (2020), and Plant-Powered Protein (2020). Her 2009 cookbook, Vegan Soups and Hearty Stews for All Seasons, was revised and released again in 2024.

VegNews listed Vegan Holiday Kitchen as one of the "Top 100 Vegan Cookbooks of All Time" in 2024.

=== Book arts ===
Atlas is a maker of artists' books, often experimenting with the physical form and incorporating found materials. Her artist's books have been included in numerous, international exhibitions including: The Sexual Politics of Meat at The Animal Museum in Los Angeles, California, 2017; Book Power Redux, 23 Sandy, Portland, Oregon, 2017, From Bande Dessinée to Artist’s Book: Testing the Limits of Franco-Belgian Comics, Center for Book ArtsNYC, 2013; Conceptually Bound 3, California State University Chico, 2007, and Mohr Gallery, CSMA, Mountain View, California, 2008.

Her works include: Secret Recipes for the Modern Wife (2009), Sluts & Studs (2008), Tomcats & Trollops (2008), (Mis)labeling Hillary (2008), Hand Jobs (2008), Deconstructing Elsie (2014), Why You Can't Get Married: an Unwedding Album (2013), The Completely-from-Scratch Steer-to-Sirloin Beef Slaughter Guide and Cookbook (2012), and Any Man Gets Tired of Toast All the Time (2007). Love and Marriage (2008) is a 1950s comic book in which all the dialogue has been replaced with original text by Atlas, and installations that feature text.

Atlas' work is in the library collections of Brooklyn Museum, National Museum of Women in the Arts, Victoria and Albert Museum, and the Wichita Art Museum.

== Bibliography ==
Conceptually Bound 3, An Exhibition of Artists’ Books by Nanette Wylde, Hunger Button Books, 2007.ISBN 978-1-936083-00-8
