= Tulva (magazine) =

Finnish feminist magazine

- Editor-in-chief: Riikka Pennanen
- Former editors: Tero Kartastenpää
- Categories: Feminist magazine; Women's magazine
- Publisher: Women's Union
- Founded: 2002; 24 years ago
- Country: Finland
- Based in: Helsinki
- Language: Finnish
- Website: Tulva
- ISSN: 1236-8792

Tulva is a feminist magazine in Helsinki, Finland, which is published three times annually. The magazine has been in circulation since 2002. Tero Kartastenpää was one of the former editors-in-chief of the magazine, which is published by the Feminist Association Union. He served in the post between 2016 and late 2019. As of 2020 the editor-in-chief is Riikka Pennanen.

Tulva is the recipient of the 2006 Quality Magazine Award.
