= Mariam Atlas =

Russian economist (1912–2006)

- Born: January 3, 1912; Astrakhan Governorate, Russian Empire
- Died: August 17, 2006 (aged 94); Korolyov, Moscow Oblast, Russia

Academic background
- Education: Kazan University; Moscow Credit and Economic Institute

Academic work
- Discipline: economics
- Institutions: Financial University under the Government of the Russian Federation (1959-2006); State Bank of the USSR

Mariam Semyonovna Atlas (Russian: Мариам Семёновна Атлас) (January 3, 1912 – August 17, 2006) was a Soviet and Russian economist, full Ph.D. in Economics, professor of Financial University under the Government of the Russian Federation (1959–2006), Honoured Scientist of the Russian Federation, one of the oldest employees of the State Bank of the USSR.

== Biography ==
Mariam Atlas was born into a family of zemstvo doctor. In the early 1920s, after the death of her father, she moved to Samara where her mother's relatives lived. In 1928, she graduated with honors from a gymnasium and a music college.

In 1933, she graduated from the Faculty of Economics of Kazan University. In 1933–1936 she studied at graduate school of the Moscow Credit and Economic Institute. In 1936–1938, she served as Head of the Loan planning department of the management board of the State Bank of the USSR.

In 1938, she became Senior Lecturer at the Moscow Credit and Economic Institute. In 1941–1943, in evacuation during World War II, she worked as Head of the department in a Gosbank office in the Tatar ASSR. In 1943, she has finally devoted herself to teaching. Since that time, the biography of Atlas is linked with the Moscow Finance Institute (now Financial University under the Government of the Russian Federation). She worked very actively until the age of 92 and brought up more than a hundred of PhDs in Economics.

She died in Korolyov, Moscow Oblast, in 2006 and buried at the Moscow's Vvedenskoye Cemetery.

== Honors and awards ==
- Order of the Red Banner of Labour.
- Order of Friendship of Peoples.
- Honored Scientist of the Russian Federation (1974).

== Family ==
Her husband was Gennady Mikhailovich Sorokin (1910–1990), an economist, Corresponding Member of the Academy of Sciences of the Soviet Union, Director of the Institute of Economics of the World Socialism System.

== Selected scientific works ==
- Nationalization of banks in the USSR. - M.: Gosfinizdat, 1948.- 189 p.
- Credit reform in the USSR. - M.: Gosfinizdat, 1958.- 384 p.
- Development of the State Bank of the USSR. - M.: Gosfinizdat, 1958.- 384 p.
- Development of banking systems in the countries of socialism. - M., 1967.
- The Political Economy of Socialism: A Study Guide for students of economic universities and faculties. M.: Higher school, 1960. -784 p.
- Political Economy Dictionary. M.: Publishing house of political literature, 1964. -303 p.
- Banks during the period of communist construction in the USSR // Finance, credit and banks during the construction of communism: Scientific notes. M.: Moscow Finance Institute, 1967.
- Atlas M.S., Barkovsky N.D., Waller L.B. et al. The monetary system of the USSR. M.: Finance, 1967. -310 p.
- Atlas M.S. Economic categories of profit and profitability in a socialist economy // Profit and profitability in the context of economic reform: Materials of a scientific conference. M.: Finance, 1968.
- Atlas M.S., Vinokur R.D., Semenkova T.G. Lenskaya S.A. et al. Political Economy Dictionary. M.: Publishing house of political literature, 1972. 367 p.
- Mariam Atlas, Alla Gryaznova, Hans Luft. Ökonomische Probleme des Übergangs vom Sozialismus und Kommunismus. Dietz Verlag, Berlin 1981.
