= The Wooster Book Company =

Coordinates: 40.79805°N 81.94186°W

Wooster Book Company
- Company type: Private
- Industry: Retail, Publishing
- Founded: Wooster, Ohio (1992)
- Founder: Carol A. Rueger and David Wiesenberg
- Headquarters: Wooster, Ohio
- Products: Books
- Website: www.woosterbook.com

The Wooster Book Company was a publishing firm and bookstore located in Wooster, Ohio.

== Company profile ==
The Wooster Book Company promoted and developed literary works of regional interest to Ohio and surrounding areas; especially those written works which feature themes of natural history and rural living.

A small publisher with over one-hundred titles, The Wooster Book Company produced titles such as Ohio’s Bicentennial Barns and Covered Bridges: Ohio, Kentucky, West Virginia. As the publisher of books by Louis Bromfield, one title, Early Autumn, a novel, won the Pulitzer Prize for Fiction and one title, Awake and Rehearse, collects several O. Henry Prize stories.

The Wooster Book Company also published books by Scott Russell Sanders, a winner of the Lannan Foundation literary award, and by Wes Jackson, president of the Land Institute.

The publishing company was directly affiliated with the bookstore of the same name.

== History ==
The Wooster Book Company was established in September 1992 as an independent bookstore. It now occupies 7,300 square feet (680 m^{2}) with over 40,000 titles.

In 2000, The Wooster Book Company took over the sponsorship and administration of the Buckeye Book Fair, Ohio's largest literary event. The Book Fair is open to the public, with approximately one hundred authors participating in the annual day-long festival.

Under the trade name “The Wooster Book Company,” its first title, a corporate history of Rubbermaid, written by retired Rubbermaid CEO and chairman of the board, Donald E. Noble, was released in 1996.

Subsequent publishing projects have been done in association with the Ohio State University Medical Center, Ohio Department of Natural Resources, Ohio Agricultural Research and Development Center, Ohio Library Council, and the American Angus Association.

Additional titles in many areas of interest have been released under ISBN prefixes 1-59098 and 1-888683.

The Wooster Book Company bookstore went up for sale in May 2017 when the founders Carol and David decided to retire. It failed to find a buyer and closed that summer after 24 years of operation.

== Awards ==
As a bellwether establishment of a downtown (Main Street) revitalization, The Wooster Book Company was the recipient of a community design commission award in 1993 for restoration and renovation and a Chamber of Commerce “Successful Business Award” (1995).

Children's programs in the bookstore were recognized with a “Friend of Young Children” award in 1997. The business expanded in 2000, rebuilt and restored its facade in 2001 as well as expanding their publishing services operation in the same year. This resulted in a second recognition for revitalization and a second nomination for a Chamber of Commerce successful business award in 2005.

In 2002, David Wiesenberg, co-owner of The Wooster Book Company was recognized with an Ohioana Citation for his contribution to the community and for commitment to Ohio literature.

The Wooster Book Company was recognized in 2008 by the Ohio Center for the Book, an affiliate of the Library of Congress, as an Advocate for the Literary Arts.
