= Galit Atlas =

Internationally known psychoanalyst

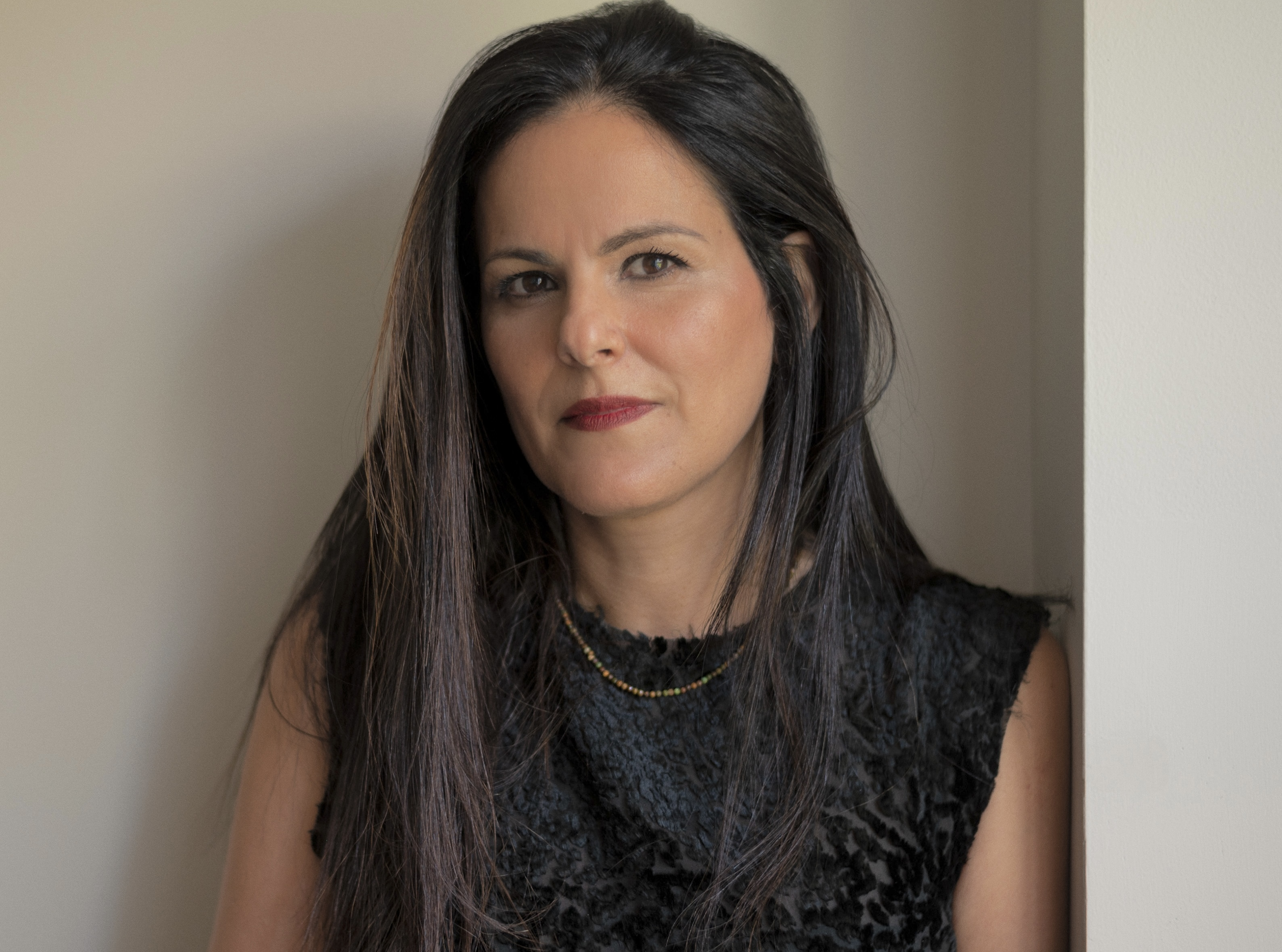
- Born: September 12, 1971 (age 55); Tel Aviv, Israel
- Known for: Relational psychoanalysis; Emotional Inheritance; Psychoanalytic practice; Gender studies and psychoanalytic theory
- Children: Emma Koch, Yali Koch, Mia Koch
- Awards: Gradiva Award (2016, 2022); Nautilus Book Award (2023)
- Website: www.galitatlas.com

Galit Atlas (born September 12, 1971) is a relational psychoanalyst who has written about the place of intimacy and desire in contemporary theory and practice.

== Career ==
Atlas is a clinical assistant professor on the faculty of the New York University Postdoctoral Program in Psychotherapy & Psychoanalysis, and a faculty member of the Columbia University Center for Psychoanalytic Training and Research.

She is also on the faculty of the National Training Programs (NTP) and the Four Year Adult Training Program.

From 2011 to 2013, she co-chaired and moderated the online Colloquium Series for the International Association for Relational Psychoanalysis and Psychotherapy (IARPP). She is on the editorial board of Psychoanalytic Perspectives and Psychoanalytic Dialogues, and served on the board of directors of the Division of Psychoanalysis (39) of the American Psychological Association.

In 2016, Atlas published an article in The New York Times which won a Gradiva Award, New Media.

Her book Emotional Inheritance received the Gradiva Award in 2022 and the Nautilus Book Award in 2023.

== Bibliography ==
- The Enigma of Desire: Sex, Longing and Belonging in Psychoanalysis (2015). Routledge. ISBN 978-1138789609
- Dramatic Dialogue: Contemporary Clinical Practice (2017), with Lewis Aron. Routledge. ISBN 9781138555488
- When Minds Meet: The Work of Lewis Aron (editor, 2020). Routledge. ISBN 978-0367622121
- Emotional Inheritance: A Therapist, Her Patients, and the Legacy of Trauma (2022). Little, Brown Spark. ISBN 978-0316492126.
