= Tor Wager =

American psychologist

Tor D. Wager
- Education: University of Michigan (PhD, 2003)
- Awards: Atkinson Prize in Psychological and Cognitive Sciences (2026)
- Scientific career
- Fields: Cognitive psychology
- Workplaces: Dartmouth College
- Thesis: Brain and behavioral mechanisms of switching attention (2003)

Tor D. Wager is the Diana L. Taylor Distinguished Professor in Neuroscience at Dartmouth College, as well as the director of the Cognitive and Affective Neuroscience Laboratory at this university. He is known for his research into the placebo effect and into the way the brain processes pain.

== Early life and education ==
Wager was raised in Christian Science in Colorado. He received his PhD in 2003 from the University of Michigan in cognitive psychology, with a focus on cognitive neuroscience. As a graduate student there, he spent some time researching brain changes in response to emotions using imaging techniques. Although Wager found the work fascinating, he later decided to study placebos because he wanted to research something that could help patients. He is most recently on the faculty at Dartmouth College in New Hampshire.

== Academic career ==
Wager became an assistant professor of psychology at Columbia University in 2004. In 2010, he became a faculty member at the University of Colorado Boulder. In 2019, Wager joined the Department of Psychological and Brain Sciences at Dartmouth College as the inaugural Diana L. Taylor 1977 Distinguished Professor of Neuroscience.

== Research ==
In 2004, while a graduate student at the University of Michigan, Wager conducted a study which found that people who reported the most relief in pain after receiving a placebo also showed the most reduction in activity in the anterior cingulate cortex, thalamus, and insula, all of which are brain regions that respond to physical pain. In 2013, Wager published a study which found that it is possible to detect physical pain, as well as measure how intense the pain was, using an fMRI scan. A 2015 study led by Wager exposed patients to pain in the form of increasing heat, and then asked them to "rethink" their pain. Wager et al. found that when the patients did so, they were able to alter the amount of pain they felt and certain brain structures linking the nucleus accumbens and ventromedial prefrontal cortex were activated.

Wager's research has also found that administering placebos to patients and telling them that the pills were pain medicine leads to their brains releasing opioids, which he has described as "the brain's own morphine." His studies have also found that placebo administration is associated with increased activity in the frontal cortex of the brain.
