= Voima (newspaper) =

Finnish-language newspaper

- Type: Ten times annually
- Format: tabloid
- Owner: Voima Kustannus Oy
- Editor: Emilia Miettinen
- Founded: 1999
- Political alignment: green-leftist
- Language: Finnish
- Headquarters: Helsinki, Finland
- Website: voima.fi

Voima (Finnish pronunciation: [ˈʋoi̯mɑ]) is a Finnish free publication, focusing on social issues and culture. The paper is published ten times annually.

Voima is a member of Council for Mass Media in Finland. It is an independent publication.

== History and profile ==
Voima was established 1999.

The paper is delivered e.g. in libraries, universities, public transportation facilities, theaters, and museums.

Publication titles include issues of human rights, environment, economics, and society. It also publishes reviews of literature, movies, theater and music.

Magazine is published by Voima Kustannus Oy. Its shareholders are Rosebud Books, Suomen Rauhanpuolustajat, Luonto-Liitto, Friends of the Earth, Heikki Hiilamo, Tuomas Rantanen and Vilppu Rantanen.

Emilia Miettinen is the editor-in-chief from the beginning of 2023.

Voima obtained the award from the Ministry of Education (Finland) in 2001.

Voima has over 180,000 regular or random readers, appeared in the gallup of TNS Kantar in 2019.

=== Le Monde diplomatique & Novaja Gazeta ===
Voima Kustannus Oy started to publish the French Le Monde diplomatique in 2007. From the following year, the books were published by subsidiary Into Kustannus Oy including Le Monde diplomatique and Novaya Gazeta paperbacks in Finnish and new Finnish paperbacks. In 2021, publishing of Finnish Le Monde diplomatique & Novaja Gazeta -magazine transferred to another subsidiary of Voima Kustannus Oy.

== Name ==
Voima is the Finnish word for power.
