= C. Dale Brittain =

American novelist

C. Dale Brittain is an American author and professor of medieval history. As well as writing historical works, she is the author of fantasy novels.

== Biography ==
Brittain's best-known novel is A Bad Spell in Yurt, the first of the Royal Wizard of Yurt series. The series continues with The Wood Nymph and the Cranky Saint, Mage Quest, The Witch and the Cathedral, Daughter of Magic, and Is This Apocalypse Necessary? The first five books, published by Baen Books, are currently out of print but are available as e-books and audiobooks and are back in print in omnibus editions. The last book in the series, published by The Wooster Book Company, remains in print.

Brittain has published three novellas in the Yurt series, The Lost Girls and the Kobold, Below the Wizards' Tower and A Long Way 'Til November. These are available as Kindle books and as a print omnibus. She has also written four books in a new next-generation Yurt series, beginning with The Starlight Raven, about a girl who wants to be the first female wizard. She has also recently written a novelette-length prequel to the original Yurt series, The Making of a Wizard. Her other fantasy books are set in universes closer to that of the real Middle Ages.

Brittain is married to Robert A. Bouchard, a molecular biologist.

== Bibliography ==
- A Bad Spell in Yurt, ISBN 0-671-72075-9. Cover by Tom Kidd. First printing August 1991; second printing February 1993; third printing May 1995. Rpt. 2011.
- The Wood Nymph and the Cranky Saint, ISBN 0-671-72156-9. Cover by Dean Morrissey. First printing February 1993.
- Mage Quest, ISBN 0-671-72169-0. Cover by Laurence Schwinger. First printing May 1993.
- Voima, ISBN 0-671-87637-6. Cover by Gary Ruddell. First printing January 1995.
- The Witch and the Cathedral, ISBN 0-671-87661-9. Cover by Newel Convers and Courtney Skinner. First printing April 1995.
- Daughter of Magic, ISBN 0-671-87720-8. Cover by Darrell K. Sweet. First printing May 1996.
- Count Scar (with Robert A. Bouchard), ISBN 0-671-87801-8. Cover by Darrell K. Sweet. First printing September 1997. Rpt. 2011
- Is This Apocalypse Necessary? ISBN 1-888683-06-6. Cover by Matthias Grünewald. First printing September 2000.
- My First Kingdom ISBN 978-1-5483-0779-0, omnibus, Kindle, April 2013; print, September 2017
- The Witch and Her Daughter ISBN 978-1-7278-4373-6, omnibus, Kindle and print, November 2018
- The Lost Girls and the Kobold, novella, Kindle, December 10, 2013
- Below the Wizards' Tower, novella, Kindle, August 31, 2014
- The Starlight Raven ISBN 978-1-5152-1150-1, Kindle, April 4, 2015; print edition 2015
- A Long Way 'Til November, novella, Kindle, September 5, 2015
- Third Time's a Charm ISBN 978-1-5234-4892-0, novella omnibus, Kindle, November 17, 2015; print edition, February 2016
- The Sign of the Rose ISBN 9781537411644, Kindle, April 2016; print, September 2016
- An Autumn Haunting ISBN 978-1-5452-9506-9, Kindle and print, May 2017
- Ashes of Heaven ISBN 978-1-5449-2266-9, Kindle and print, May 2017
- Positively Medieval: Life and Society in the Middle Ages ISBN 9781719584593, Kindle, April 2018, print, June 2018
- Heretic Wind (with Robert A. Bouchard) ISBN 979-8614159961, Kindle, November 2019, print, March 2020
- How I Survived Junior High ISBN 979-8-6447-4455-8, Kindle and print, May 2020
- The Sapphire Ring ISBN 979-8721123284, Kindle and print, April 2021
- The Knight of the Short Nose ISBN 979-8-5284-5266-1, Kindle and print, August 2021
- Roy Fox and the Palmatian ISBN 979-8-3967-5513-0, Kindle and print, July 2023
- The Ill-Born Prince ISBN 979-8-3222-3363-3, Kindle and print, August 2024
- The Making of a Wizard ISBN 979-8-2978-2541-3, Kindle and print, September 2025
