= Felix Saarikoski =

Finnish politician

Felix Saarikoski (21 June 1857 in Kuopio – 4 July 1920) was a Finnish politician. He was a member of the Senate of Finland.
