= Ukrainian T-shaped Radio telescope, second modification =

Large observatory in the 8–33 MHz band

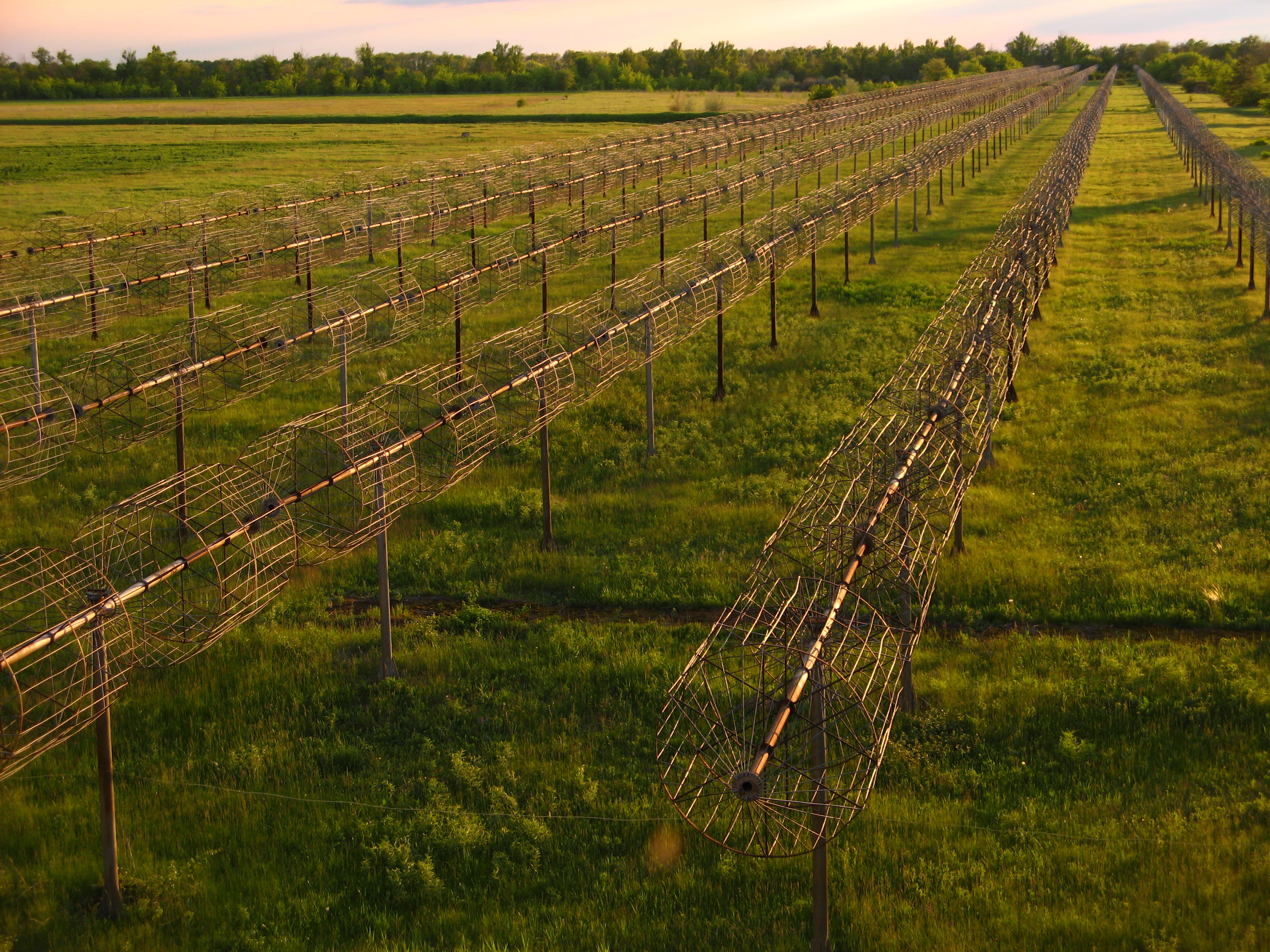
- Alternative names: UTR-2
- Location(s): Volokhiv Yar, Chuhuiv Raion, Kharkiv Oblast, Ukraine
- Coordinates: 49°38′17″N 36°56′10″E
- Wavelength: 9.1 m (33 MHz)–37 m (8.1 MHz)
- Collecting area: 15 ha (1,600,000 sq ft)
- Location of Ukrainian T-shaped Radio telescope, second modification
- Related media on Commons

The Ukrainian T-shaped Radio telescope, second modification (official abbreviation UTR-2) is the world's largest low-frequency radio telescope at decametre wavelengths. It was completed in 1972 near the village of Hrakovo (49°38′N 36°56′E), 15 km west-south-west from Shevchenkove, Ukraine. The telescope is operated by the Institute of Radio Astronomy of the Ukrainian Academy of Sciences.

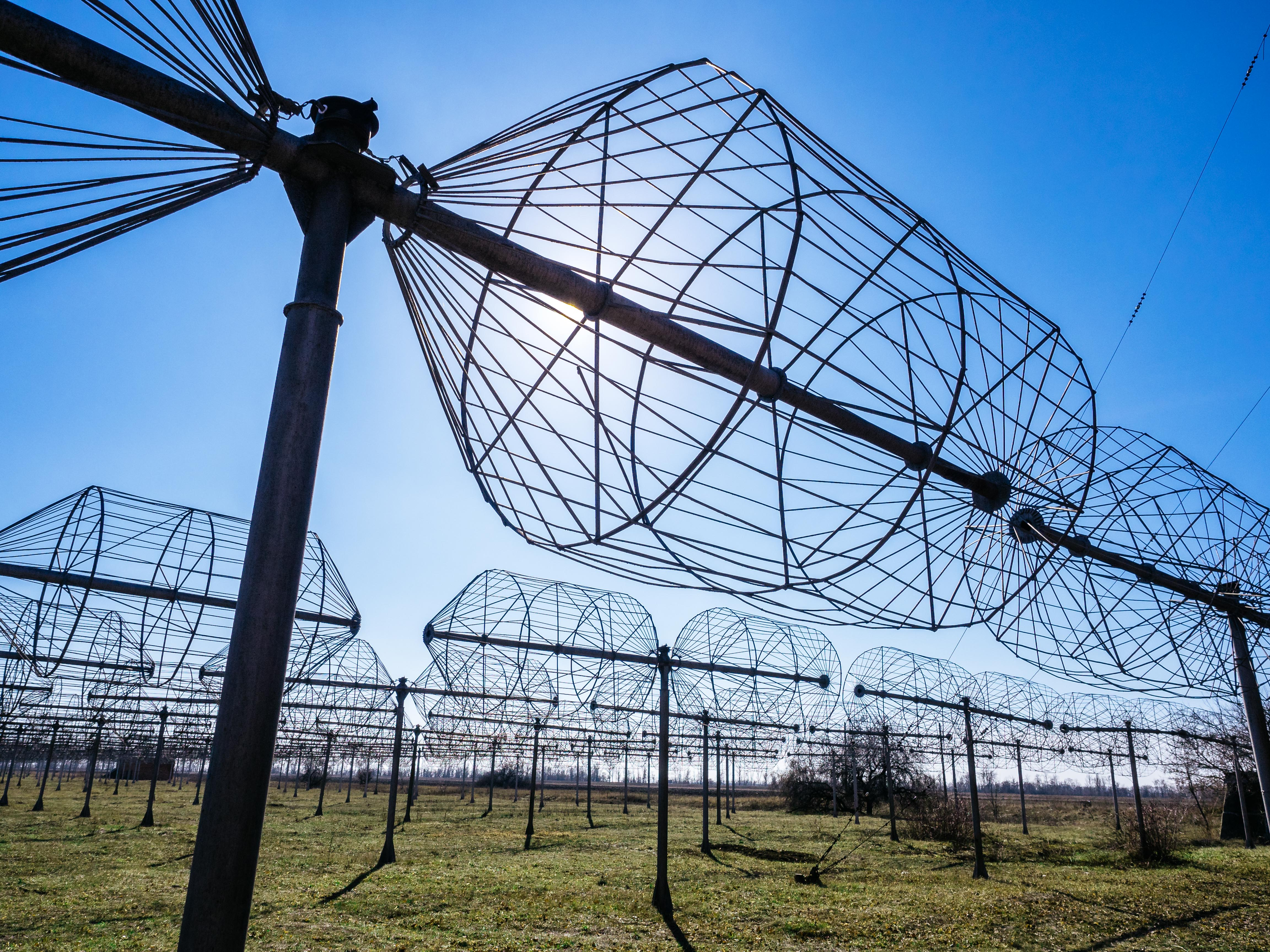
Some of the 2040 cage dipole elements of which the antenna is composed

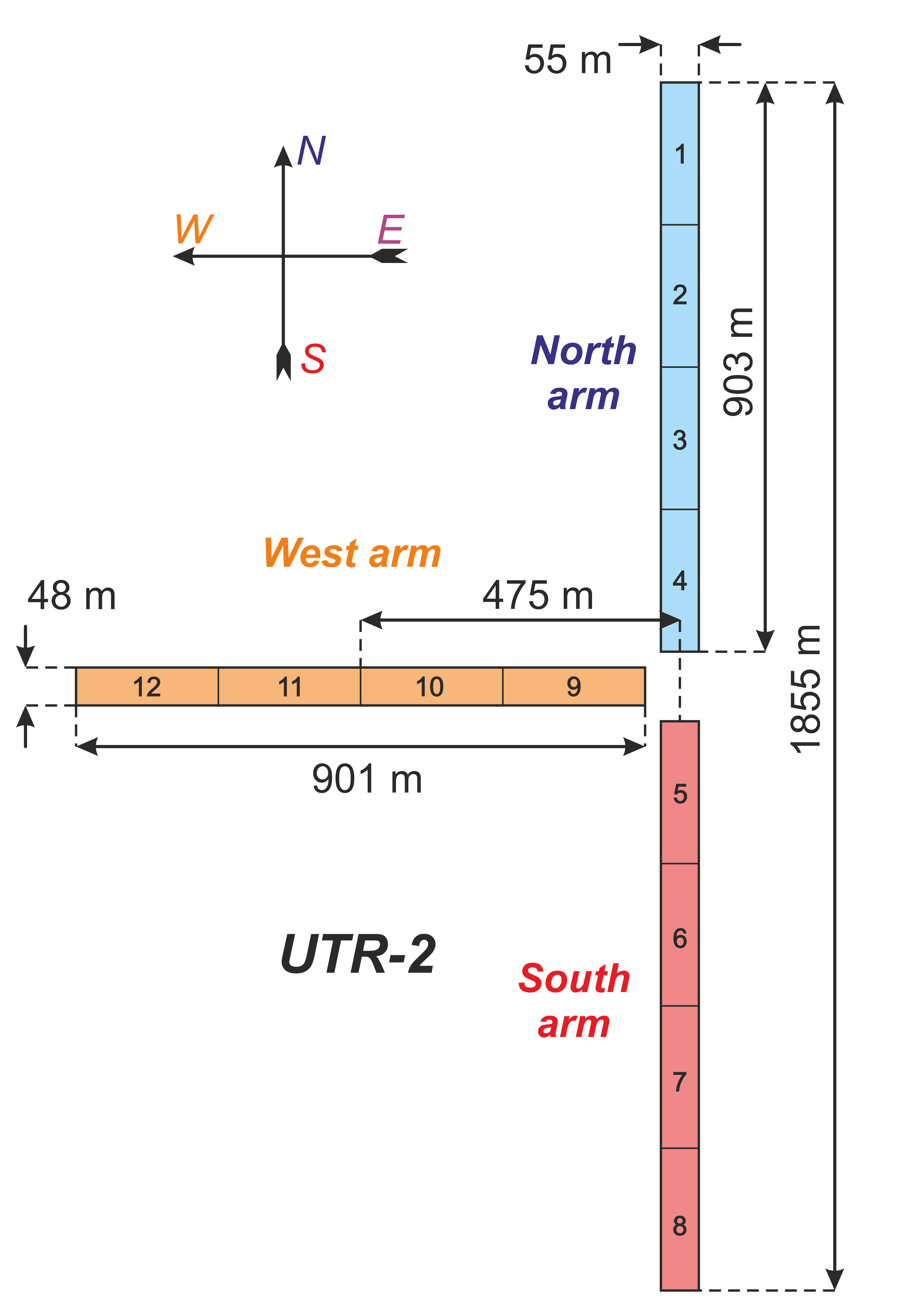
Geometrical configuration of the UTR-2 radio telescope

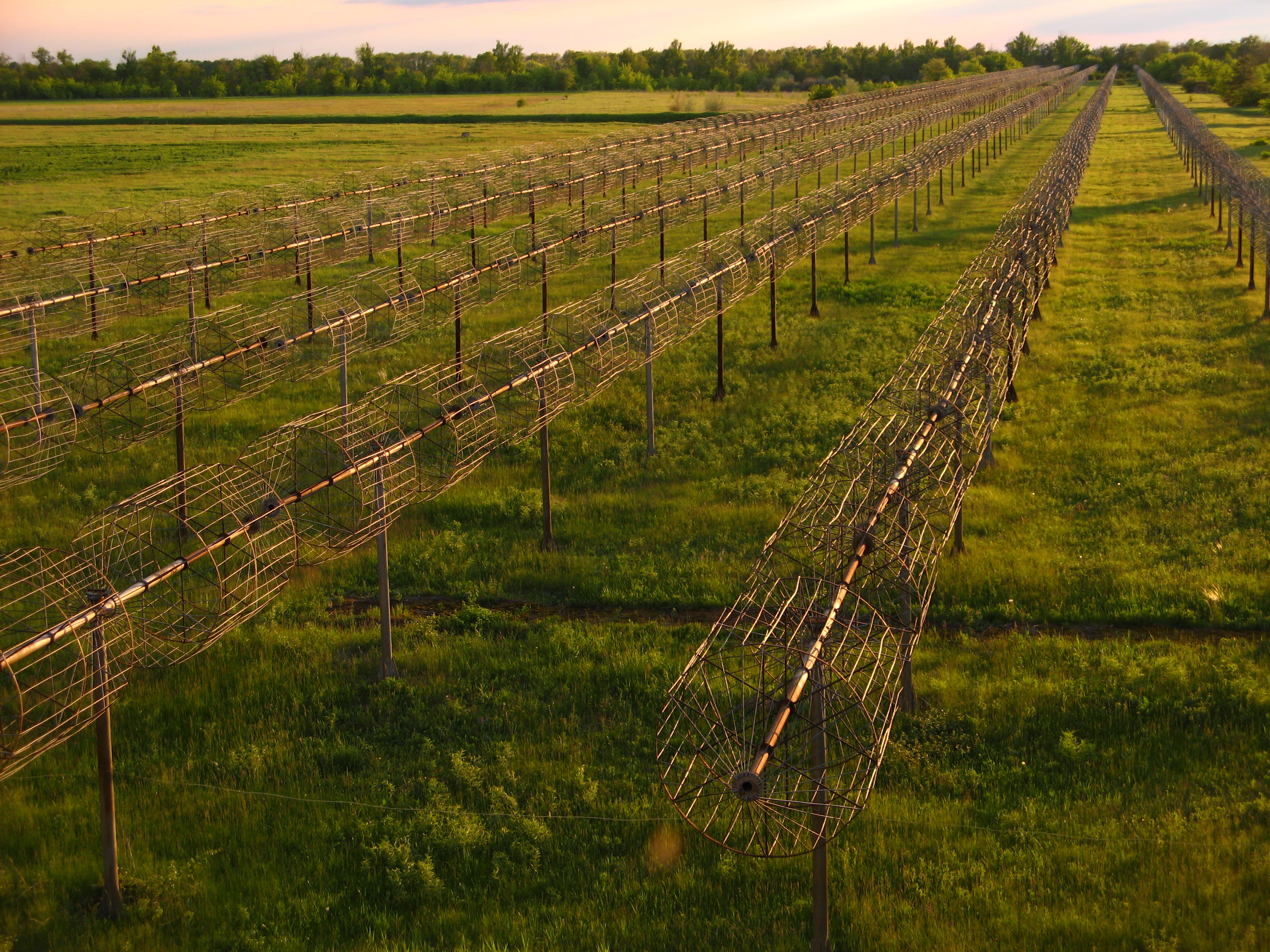
West arm of UTR-2 radio telescope phased array antenna (6×100 dipoles)

The UTR-2 consists of an array of 2040 dipole elements in two arms each containing 6 rows of elements, oriented in a T shape: a north–south arm consisting of 1440 elements covering an area of 1800×60 meters, and an east–west arm consisting of 600 elements covering an area of 900×60 meters. The basic element is a broadband cage dipole 1.8 m in diameter and 8 m long made of galvanized steel wire, mounted 3.5 m above the ground, with a balun to connect it to the transmission line. The dipoles are all oriented along the east–west axis, with the spacing between rows of 7.5 m in east–west direction and 9 m in north–south. It has a total area of 150,000 square metres (1,600,000 sq ft), and a resolution of about 40 arcminutes at the middle frequency 16.7 MHz. The operating frequency range is 8–33 MHz. The sensitivity is about 10 mJy.

Steering of the antenna main lobe is accomplished with phase shifters consisting of switchable delay lines.

The telescope is a part of the URAN (Ukrainian Radio Interferometer of NASU) decametric VLBI system, which includes another four significantly smaller low-frequency radio telescopes. That system has bases from 40 to 900 km (25 to 559 mi).

The observatory's measuring complex and scientific equipment, but not the antennas, were completely destroyed in the 2022 Russian invasion of Ukraine. The repair of the UTR-2 and GURT observatories will cost an estimated $4 million US (of which $150,000 has been secured from Ukraine's National Academy of Sciences (NAS)). This reflects the critical reliance on foreign funds and international collaboration for both scientific endeavors and education. Despite these challenges, foreign scientists remain optimistic about the observatory's future.

== See also ==
- List of radio telescopes
