= Ance =

Ance may refer to:

- Ance, Latvia
- Ance, Pyrénées-Atlantiques, Nouvelle-Aquitaine, France
- Associazione Nazionale Costruttori Edili (ANCE), the Italian Association of private construction contractors
