= Soviet Deep Space Network =

Network of space communication facilities

The Soviet Deep Space Network (or Russian Deep Space Network) is a network of large antennas and communication facilities that support interplanetary spacecraft missions, and radio and radar astronomy observations for the exploration of the Solar System and the universe during Soviet times. It was built to support the space missions of the Soviet Union. Similar networks are run by the USA, China, Europe, Japan, and India.

As of present, the Deep Space Network is maintained by Russia.

== History ==
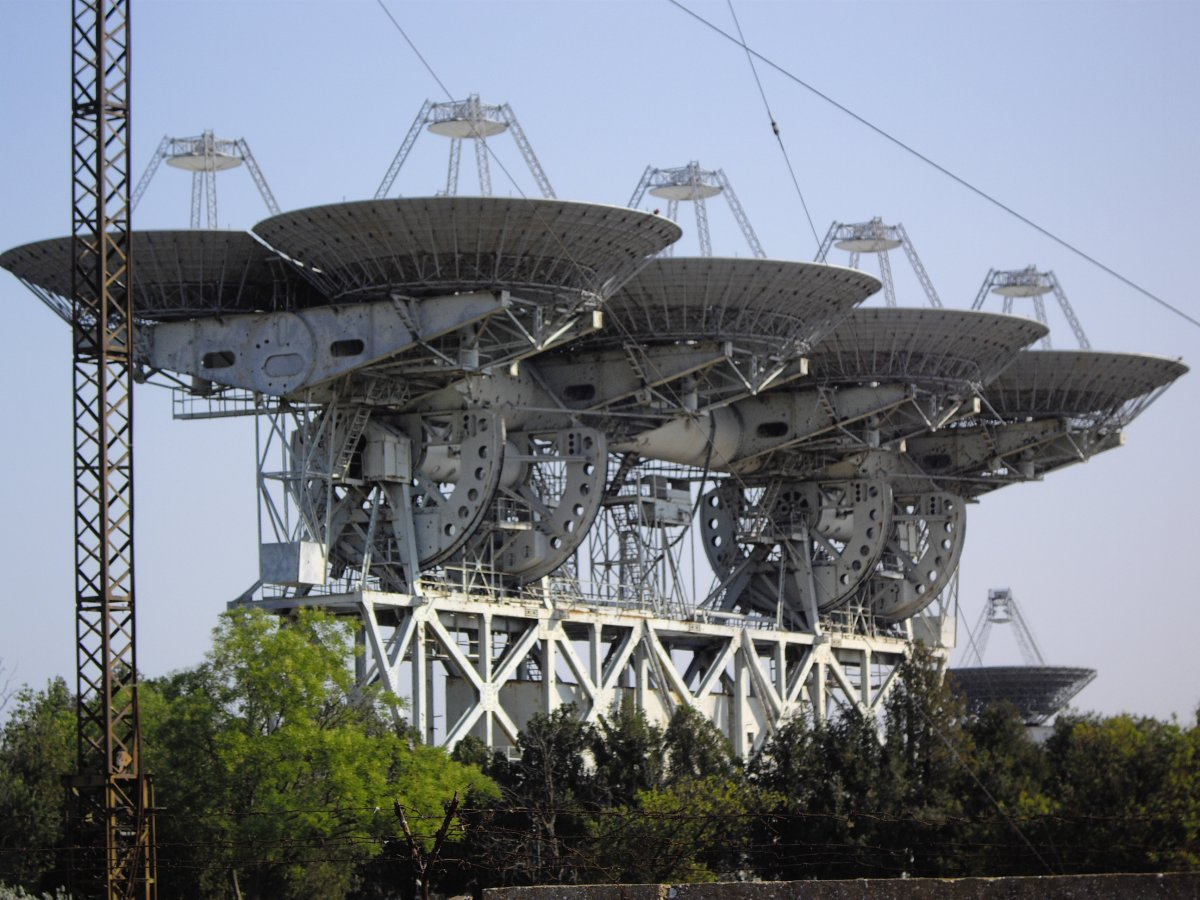
One of two receiver antennas of the North station, used in the early 1960s.

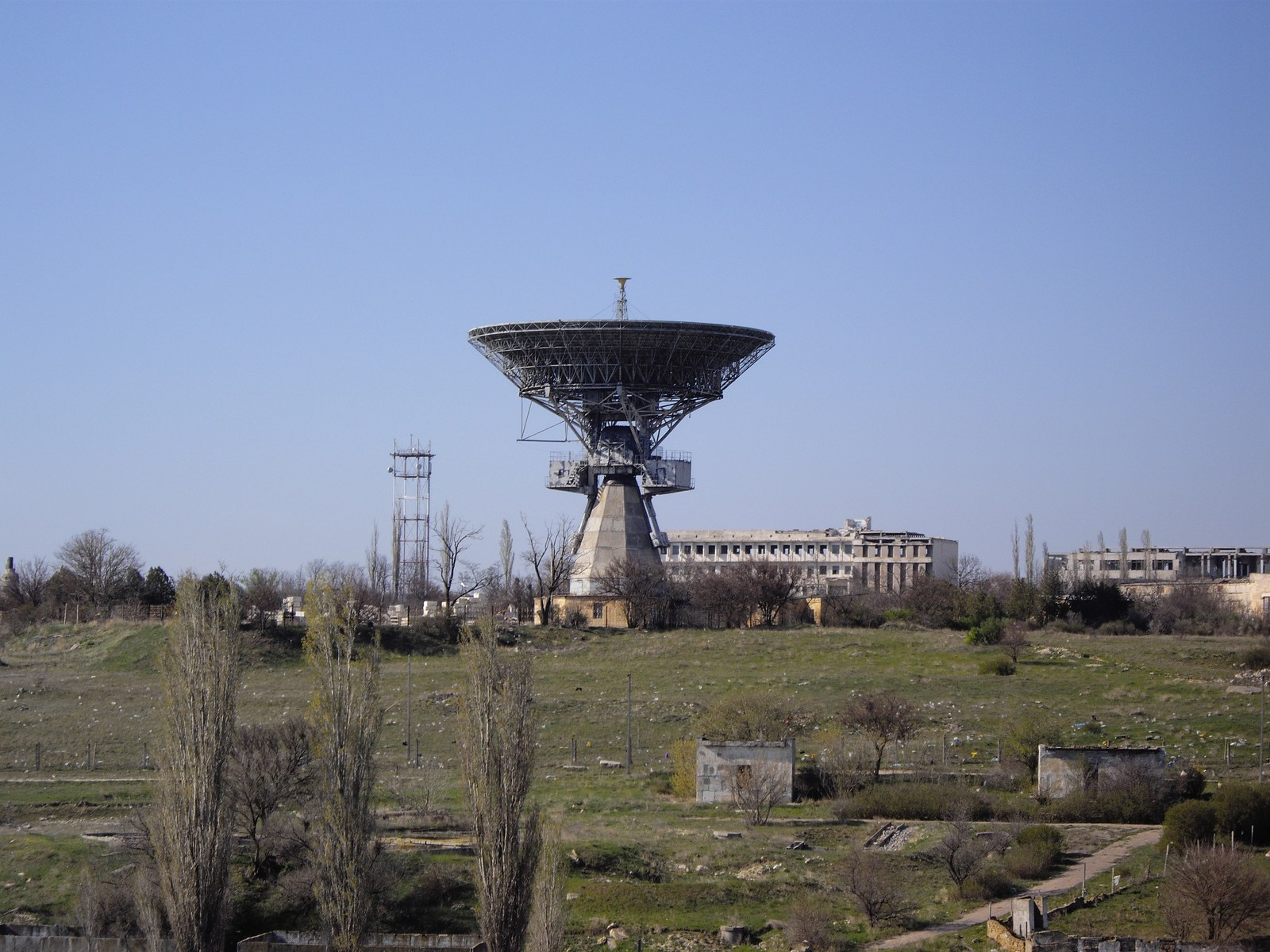
The 32-metre diameter antenna in 2009, along with the partially-completed buildings from the Soviet era

The first Soviet space communications network had 13 stations and was designed to track Earth orbiting satellites, not deep space probes.

Interplanetary missions require larger antennas, more powerful transmitters, and more sensitive receivers, and an effort was started in 1959 to support the planned 1960 launch of the Venera series of missions to Venus and the Mars program of spacecraft to Mars. The selected design consisted of eight 16-meter dishes placed on two hulls of diesel submarines, welded together and laid down on the railway bridge trusses. These trusses were mounted on bearings from battleship gun turrets. Three such antennas were built: the two North stations for receiving, and the south station a few kilometers away for transmitting.

In 1978, these antennas were augmented by the 70-meter antennas at Yevpatoria and Ussuriisk. Construction on a third antenna at Suffa, Uzbekistan was halted with the collapse of the Soviet Union. As of 16 October 2018, the Director of the radio observatory, Gennady Shanin, announced that a two-year "roadmap" for completing construction had been agreed to by Russia and Uzbekistan.

On June 24, 2024, Ukraine launched at least four missiles at the Yevpatoria facility in Crimea, currently occupied by Russia. Damage to the site and current status is unknown.

== Facilities ==
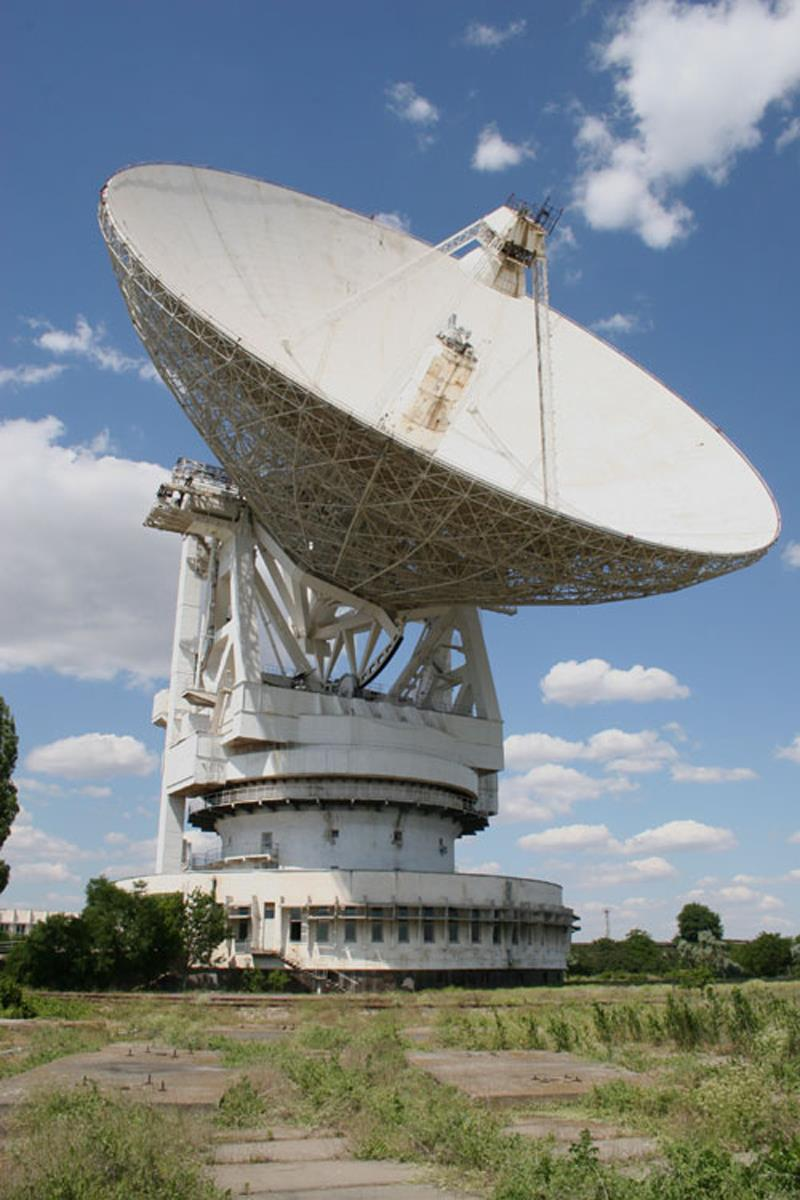
The 70 meter antenna at Yevpatoria

There were four main antennas in the Russian Deep Space Network:

- A 64-meter antenna at Bear Lakes, near Moscow, Russia
- A 64-meter antenna at Kalyazin, Russia
- A 70-meter antenna at Yevpatoria in Crimea, currently occupied by Russia
- A 70-meter antenna at Galenki near Ussuriisk, in Primorsky Krai, Russia
- A 70-meter antenna on the Suffa plateau in Uzbekistan was never completed

== Missions ==
Some of the Soviet space program missions that have communicated by the Soviet DSN include:

- Venera 11 and Venera 12
- Venera 13, Venera 14, Venera 15, Venera 16
- Vega program
- Astron
- Phobos program
- Granat
- Interball
- Spektr-R
- Fobos-Grunt (in 2011)
