= RT-32 =

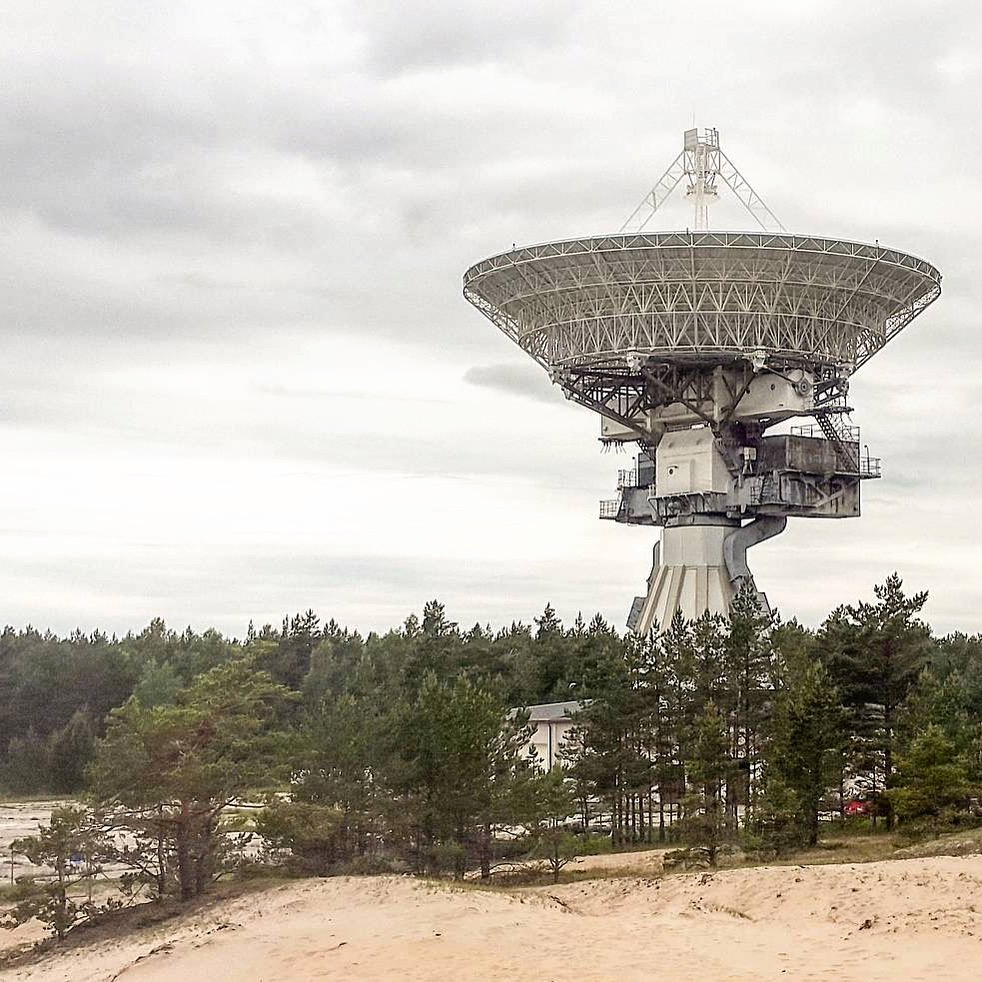
- Example of an RT-32 radio telescope (Irbene, Latvia)
- Alternative names: 32-meter radio telescope
- Location: Latvia
- Coordinates: 57°33′14″N 21°51′13″E
- Wavelength: Centimetre wavelengths (approx. 1.4–22 GHz / L, C, X, K bands)
- Telescope style: Fully steerable Cassegrain radio telescope
- Number of telescopes: At least 4 completed installations
- Diameter: 32 m (105 ft)
- Collecting area: 804 m^{2} (8,650 sq ft)
- Mounting: Altazimuth
- Location within Latvia

RT-32 is a radio telescope.

== Examples ==
- RT-32, at the Ventspils International Radio Astronomy Centre, near Ventspils, Latvia
- RT-32, at the Badary Radio Astronomical Observatory, Badary, Buryatia, Russia
- RT-32, at the Radioastronomical Observatory Zelenchukskaya, Zelenchukskaya, Karachaevo-Cherkessiya, Russia
- RT-32, at the Svetloe Radio Astronomical Observatory, Svetloe, Karelia, Russia

== See also ==
- List of radio telescopes
