= Rinda (disambiguation) =

Rinda may refer to

- Rinda (Norse mythology), a person in Norse mythology, sometimes called Rindr
- Rinda (Okage), a character from the console role-playing game Okage: Shadow King
- Rinda, Latvia, a village in Ance Parish, Latvia
- Rinda, river in Latvia
