= RT-64 =

Russian radio telescopes

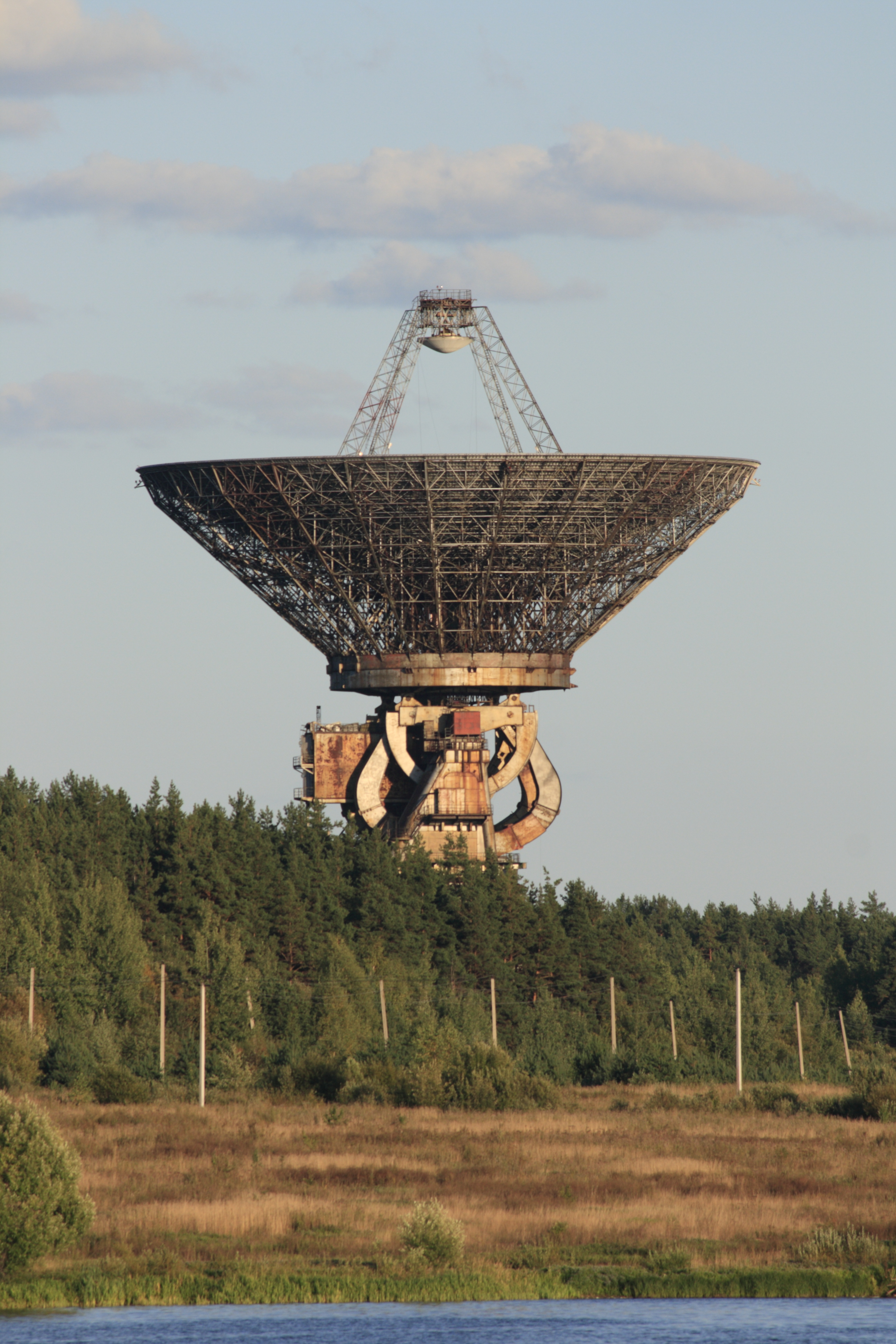
64-m aerial TNA-1500 (RT-64 radio telescope) in Kalyazin.

RT-64 are two radio telescopes in Russia with 64-metre (210 ft) antenna diameter which are among the largest radio telescopes in the world.

The Bear Lakes RT-64 radio telescope at the Bear Lakes Satellite Communications Center is located in Medvezh'i Ozera, Shchyolkovo, near Moscow. The Kalyazin RT-64 radio telescope at the Kalyazin Radio Astronomy Observatory is located in Kalyazin.

== Location ==
Site	Co-ordinates
Kalyazin	57.2228°N 37.9002°E
Bear Lakes	55.8681°N 37.9519°E

== See also ==
- RT-70, a larger aperture Russian design.
- RT-32
