= Ventspils International Radio Astronomy Centre =

Radio astronomy installation in Latvia

Ventspils International Radio Astronomy Center
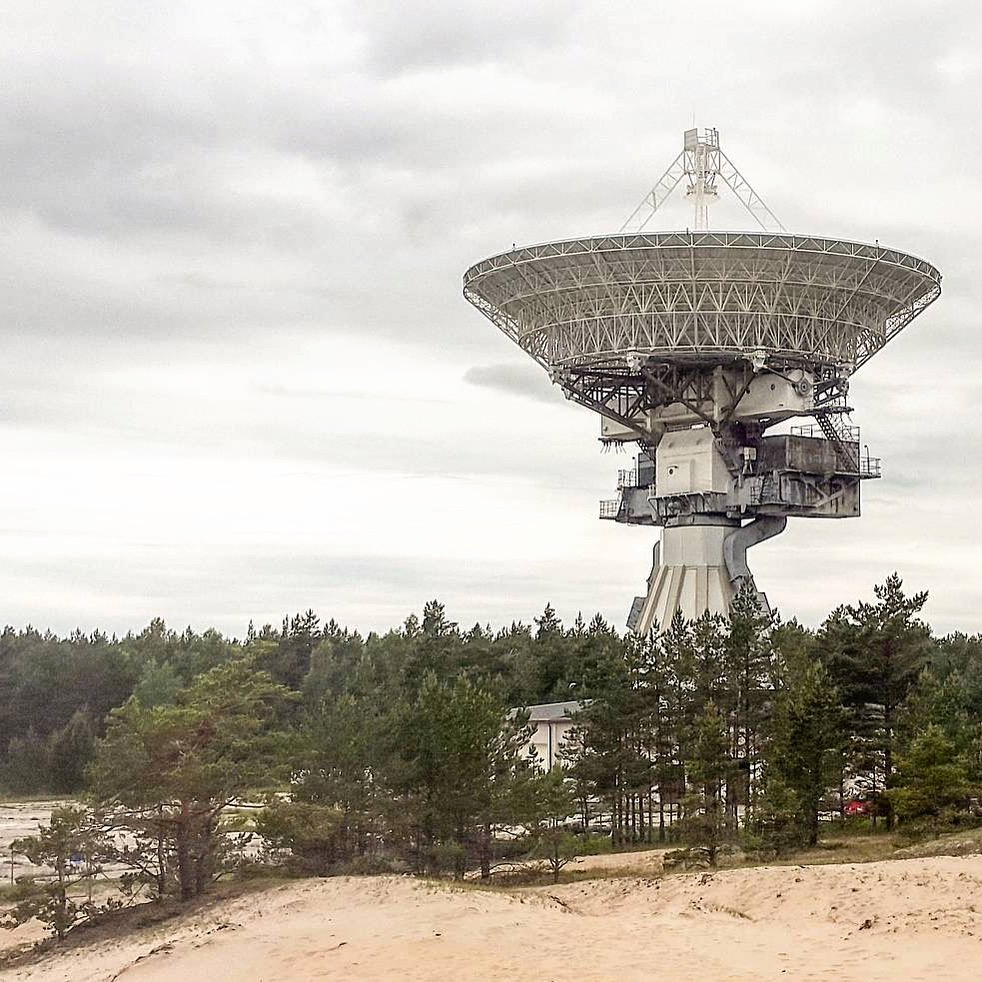
- The RT-32 radio telescope
- Alternative names: VIRAC
- Location: Latvia
- Coordinates: 57°33′13″N 21°51′18″E
- Website: en.venta.lv/science/ventspils-international-radio-astronomy-centre
- Telescopes: RT-32
- Related media on Commons

Ventspils International Radio Astronomy Centre (Latvian: Ventspils Starptautiskais radioastronomijas centrs – VIRAC) is an ex-Soviet radio astronomy installation 30 km north of Ventspils, Latvia, on the coast of the Baltic Sea in Ance parish. The installation was secret until 1993 after Latvia regained independence. It was taken over by the Latvian Academy of Sciences after the withdrawal of the Soviet Army in 1994. Since then, two of the three radio telescopes have been repaired and renewed.

== Description ==
Located in woodlands near Irbene, in Ventspils Municipality, Latvia, the centre was founded in 1974 by the Soviet military. It originally consisted of a 32-metre telescope, along with two smaller telescopes and a communications centre, and was known as Zvezdochka, meaning "Little Star". It was possibly used by the KGB during the Cold War to spy on communications between Europe and the United States.

It became a scientific research facility in the 1990s, established on 22 July 1994 as part of the Latvian Academy of Sciences, before becoming an independent organisation on 24 April 1996. It is now known as the Ventspils International Radioastronomy Center ("Ventspils Starptautiskais radioastronomijas centrs"), or the Irbene Astronomy Center.

== RT-32 ==
RT-32 is a 32-metre (105 ft) parabolic radio telescope. It is made up of over 20,000 components, and the central cone weighs 80 tonnes. The fully steerable telescope observes at centimetre wavelengths. The combination of size and precision engineering makes the larger dish especially valuable to scientists. The structure was built by a naval factory in Ukraine, and the interiors are reminiscent of a ship.

The telescope is mounted on a 25-metre-high (82 ft) tower. It has an 11.45-metre (37.6 ft) focal length, and a 2.5-metre (8.2 ft) secondary mirror.

In its first upgrade since being constructed, RT-32 was temporarily dismantled towards the end of 2014, and moved to a purpose-built shelter for restoration. The restoration includes re-welding the panels, replacing rusted parts, and repairing damage caused by the passage of time, water ingress and lightning strikes. The telescope will also be upgraded to enable it to be controlled remotely, and to be able to make more precise and sensitive observations. The telescope will be used in Very-long-baseline interferometry. The restoration cost around €16 million overall, with the restoration of the telescope panels costing around €1.5 million; the restoration was funded by the European Union and Latvian state and Ventspils district governments. The dish of the telescope was remounted in June 2015, with the restoration due to be completed in October 2015.

== RT-16 ==
The centre also has a 16 metres (52 ft) parabolic radio telescope.

== LOFAR ==
Since October 2019, the VIRAC observatory in Irbene includes a LOFAR station.

== See also ==
- List of astronomical observatories
