= FIEC =

FIEC may refer to:

- Fellowship of Independent Evangelical Churches, an organisation linking independent, evangelical churches in the areas of the United Kingdom
- Fellowship of Independent Evangelical Churches (Australia)
- Fox Island Electric Cooperative, a utility cooperative in Vinalhaven, Maine
- European Construction Industry Federation, see Associazione Nazionale Costruttori Edili
- International Federation of Associations of Classical Studies.
