= RT-70 =

70m aperture radio telescope

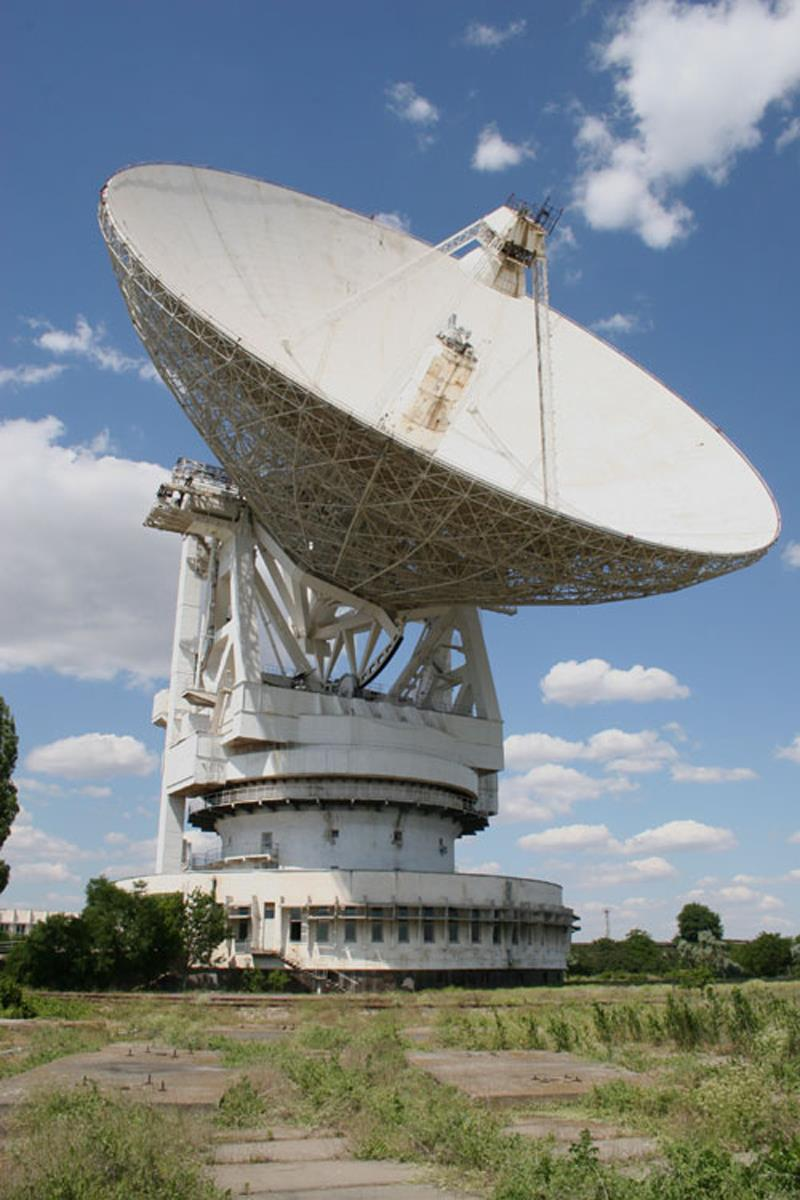
- 70-m aerial P-2500 (RT-70 radio telescope) in Yevpatoria
- Alternative names: P-2500 (П-2500)
- Part of: Center for Deep Space Communications (West Center); East Center for Deep Space Communications; Suffa Radio Observatory
- Location: Yevpatoria, Crimea, Ukraine; Galenki (Ussuriysk), Russia; Suffa plateau, Uzbekistan
- Organization: Former Soviet Deep Space Network; Roscosmos / Russian space surveillance
- Wavelength: 1 mm – 6 cm (5–300 GHz)
- Telescope style: Fully steerable Cassegrain radio telescope / radar telescope
- Number of telescopes: 3 (2 completed, 1 uncompleted)
- Diameter: 70 m (230 ft)
- Collecting area: 2,500 m^{2} (27,000 sq ft) (effective, P-2500) / 3,848 m^{2} (41,420 sq ft) (geometric)
- Mounting: Altazimuth

There are three radio telescopes designated RT-70, all in countries that were once part of the former Soviet Union, all with similar specifications: 70m dishes and an operating range of 5–300GHz. They are a part of the former Soviet Deep Space Network, now operated by Russia. The Yevpatoria facility has also been used as a radar telescope in observations of space debris and asteroids.

With their 70m antenna diameter, they are among the largest radio telescopes in the world.

They are:

- the Yevpatoria RT-70 radio telescope at the former soviet Center for Deep Space Communications or West Center for Deep Space Communications, Yevpatoria, Crimea, Ukraine.
- the Galenki RT-70 radio telescope at the East Center for Deep Space Communications, Galenki (Ussuriysk), Russia.
- the Suffa RT-70 radio telescope at the Suffa Radio Observatory on the Suffa plateau, Uzbekistan. Never completed.

In 2008, RT-70 was used to beam 501 messages at the exoplanet Gliese 581c, in hopes of making contact with extraterrestrial intelligence. The messages should arrive in 2029.

== See also ==
- RT-64, a smaller aperture Russian design.
