= Suffa RT-70 radio telescope =

Astronomical telescope in Uzbekistan

- Location: Uzbekistan
- Coordinates: 39°37′N 68°27′E
- Altitude: 2,324 m (7,625 ft)
- Diameter: 70 m (229 ft 8 in)
- Website: asc-lebedev.ru?dep=16
- Location within Uzbekistan

The Suffa RT-70 radio telescope (Russian: Суффа РТ-70) is an RT-70 radio telescope at the Suffa Radio Observatory on the Suffa plateau in Uzbekistan.

== History ==
Construction began in the late 1980s but was put on hold when the Soviet Union fell and the Uzbekistani government abandoned the project. As of 2008, the Russian government had resumed the construction of the site, with an updated emphasis on millimeter-wave band observations at 100–300 GHz. As of 2014, construction was reported to be 50% complete. As of 16 October 2018, the Director of the radio observatory, Gennady Shanin, announced that a two-year "roadmap" for completing construction had been agreed to by Russia and Uzbekistan.

With its 70m antenna diameter, this third unit of the RT-70 telescope was designed to be one of three similar radio telescopes.

Two completed RT-70 telescopes are:

- Yevpatoria RT-70 radio telescope – at the Center for Deep Space Communications, Yevpatoria, Crimea
- Galenki RT-70 radio telescope – at the Ussuriysk Astrophysical Observatory, Russia
