= Irbene =

Ghost village in Ventspils Municipality, Latvia

- Ghost town
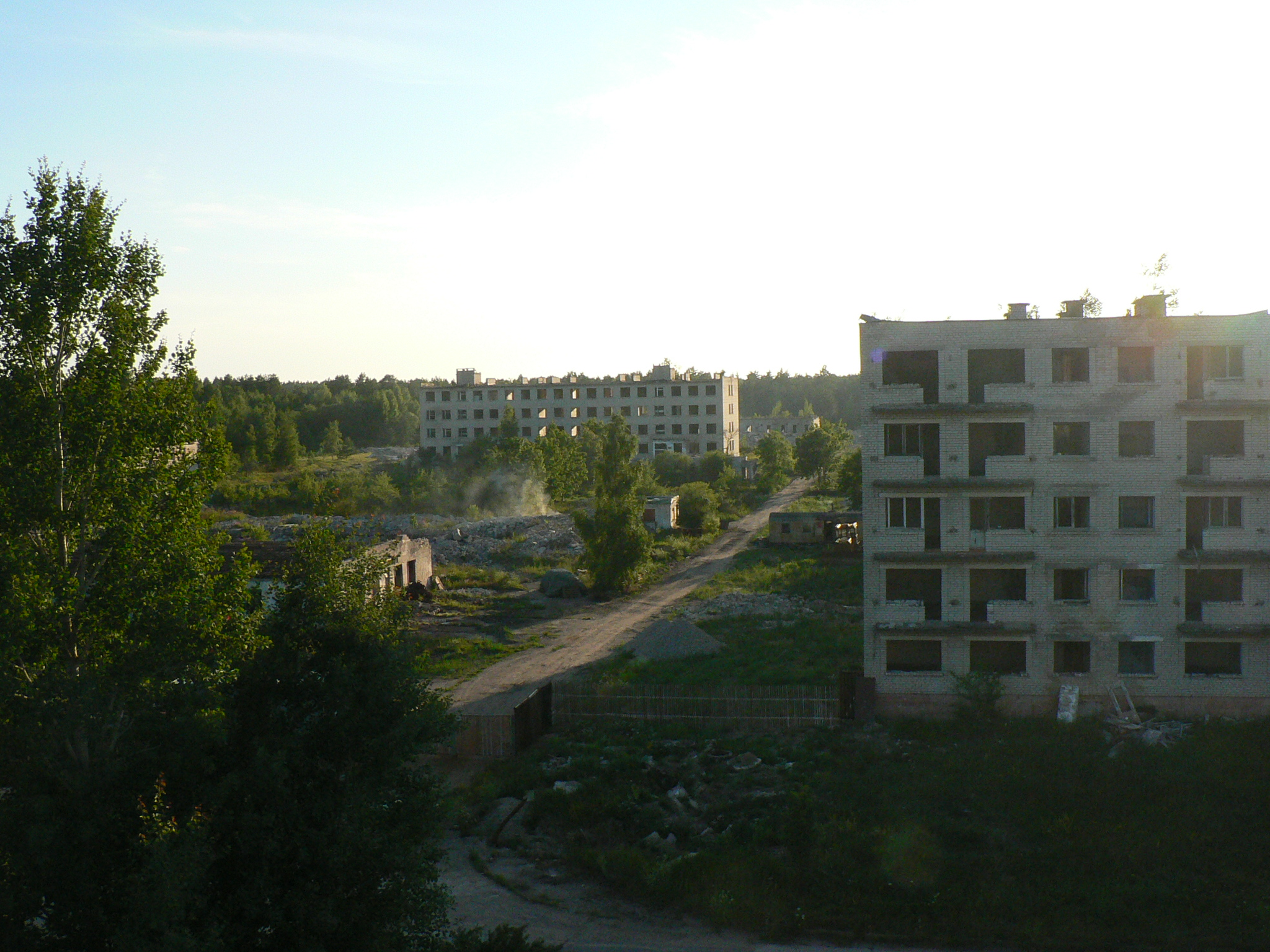
- Abandoned houses in Irbene in 2014

- Location within Latvia
- Coordinates: 57°33′53″N 21°51′46″E
- Country: Latvia
- Municipality: Ventspils Municipality
- Parish: Ance parish
- Established: 1971

Population (2019)
  - Total: 0
- Time zone: UTC+2 (EET)
  - Summer (DST): UTC+3 (EEST)

Irbene is a ghost town (legally - village) in Ance Parish, Ventspils Municipality in northwestern Latvia. In 1971, the Soviet Union established the secret radar center Zvezda (Russian: Звезда, lit. 'Star') and built a settlement for military officers and their families, naming it Irbene because of nearby river Irbe.

The town had a school, shop, sport and concert halls. However, the town was not marked on maps. Only the holders of a special permit were able to access Irbene.

After the withdrawal of the Soviet Army in 1993 the town became abandoned.

Zvezda was later acquired by the Ventspils International Radio Astronomy Centre in 1990s and is still in operation.
