= Ance, Latvia =

Village in Latvia

Coordinates: 57°30′46″N 22°01′22″E

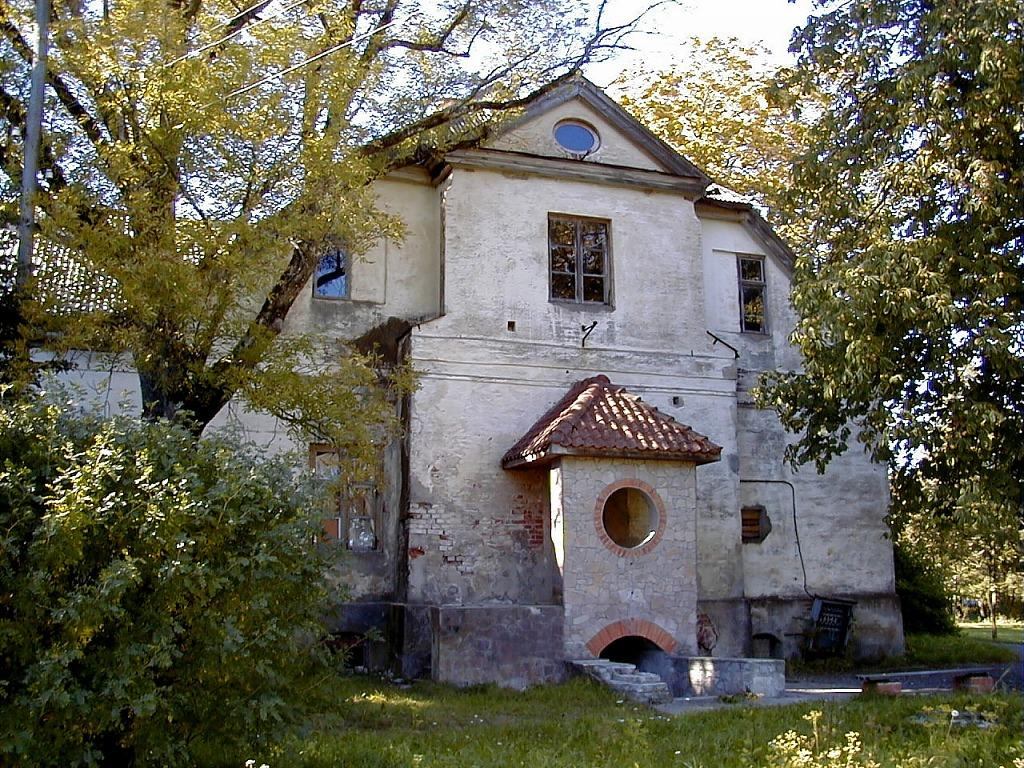
Ances muižas pils 2000-09-17.

Ance (Livonian: Aņtš) is a village in the Ance Parish of Ventspils Municipality in the Courland region of Latvia.

== See also ==
- Ance parish
