= Galenki RT-70 radio telescope =

Observatory in Primorsky Krai, Russia

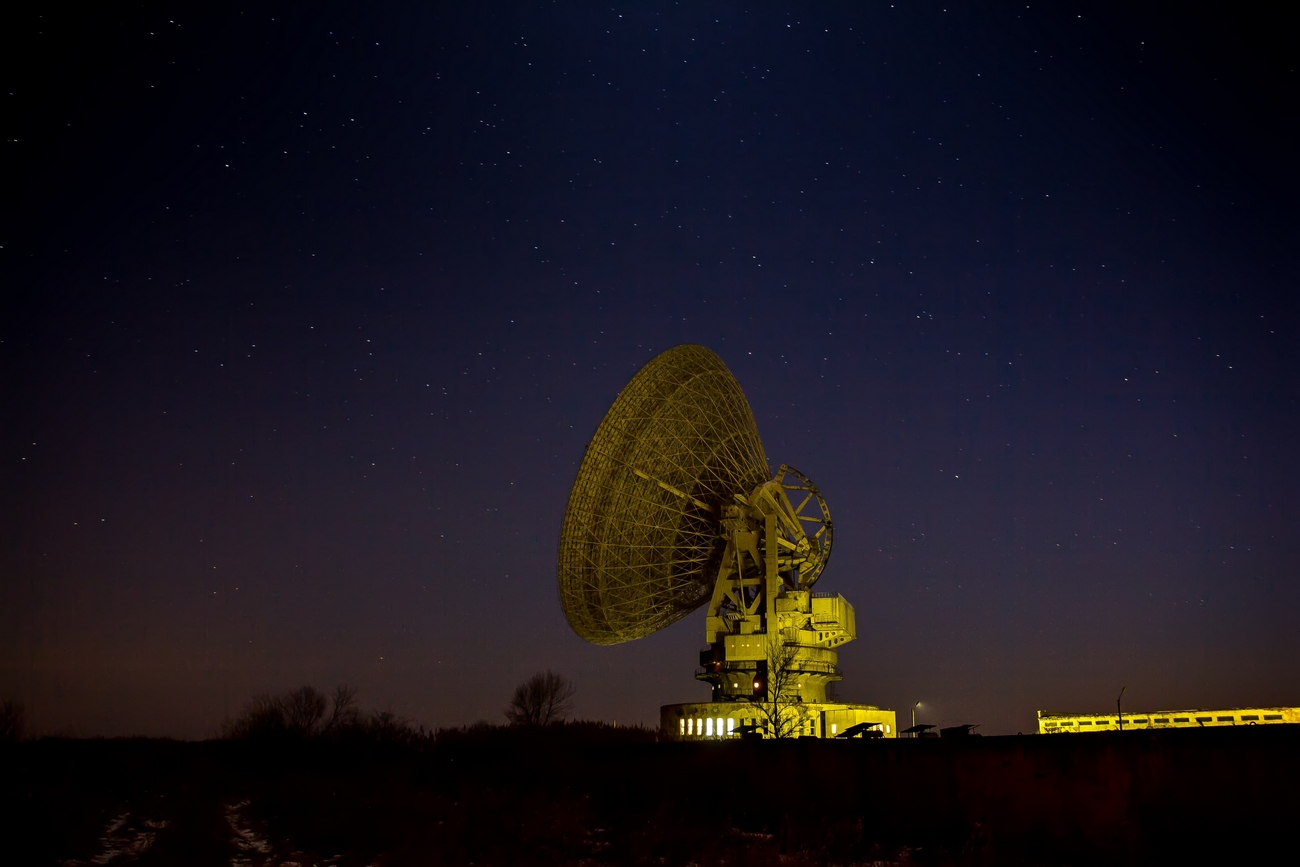
- Location(s): Galyonki, Pokrovsky rural settlement, Oktyabrsky District, Primorsky Krai, Primorsky Krai, Russia
- Coordinates: 44°00′58″N 131°45′25″E
- Altitude: 200 m (660 ft)
- Diameter: 70 m (229 ft 8 in)
- Location of Galenki RT-70 radio telescope
- Related media on Commons

The Galenki RT-70 radio telescope (Russian: Галёнки РТ-70) is an RT-70 telescope at the East Center for Deep Space Communications, Galenki (Ussuriysk), Russia.

With its 70m antenna diameter, it is among the largest single dish radio telescopes in the world. It forms part of the Soviet Deep Space Network.

Two other RT-70 telescopes are:

- Yevpatoria RT-70 radio telescope – at the Center for Deep Space Communications, Yevpatoria
- Suffa RT-70 radio telescope – at the Suffa Radio Observatory, under construction.
