= Ance Parish =

Parish in Ventspils Municipality, Latvia

- parish of Latvia
- Coat of arms

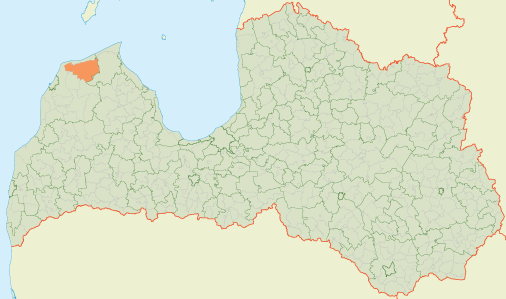
- 57°31′32″N 22°02′54″E
- Country: Latvia

Area
  - Total: 393.96 km^{2} (152.11 sq mi)
  - Land: 385.96 km^{2} (149.02 sq mi)
  - Water: 8 km^{2} (3.1 sq mi)

Population (1 January 2025)
  - Total: 500
  - Density: 1.3/km^{2} (3.4/sq mi)

Ance Parish (Latvian: Ances pagasts) is an administrative territorial entity of Ventspils Municipality in the Courland region of Latvia. The administrative center is the village of Ance.

The parish has a population of 712 (as of 1/07/2010) and covers an area of 397.78 km^{2}.

== Villages of Ance Parish ==
- Ance
- Irbene (uninhabited)
- Jorniņi
- Kārļmuiža
- Lonaste
- Ostupciems
- Rinda
- Silciems
- Virpe
