= Associazione Nazionale Costruttori Edili =

Italian private constriction contractors association

Associazione Nazionale Costruttori Edili (ANCE) is the Italian Association of Private Construction Contractors, active in public works, residential and industrial building. It represents 20 regional organisations, 101 provincial associations and 20,000 construction companies of any specialization and dimension.

ANCE and its local associations safeguard the construction industry vis a vis the Government and Parliament, through its lobbying activity. ANCE also engages in dialogue with political, social and cultural Institutions.

ANCE ensures relationships with Administrative Authorities in governing the territory, planning investments and designing interventions.

ANCE and its local Associations offers assistance and consultancy services in the following fields:

- Legislative
- Economic and industrial relations

ANCE is engaged in:

- Tendering for public procurement and relationships with the employers;
- Public and private Financing;
- Technical innovation and quality certification;
- The implementation of fiscal regulations;
- Company qualification for Public works

At the International level ANCE adheres to:

- FIEC – European Construction Industry Federation
- EIC – European International Contractors
- UNICE – Union of Industrial and Employers' Confederations of Europe through Confindustria - Confederazione Generale dell'Industria Italiana
- UEPC – Union Europeenne des Promoteurs-Constructeurs
